= Western Satraps =

Indo-Scythian rulers of western and central India (35-415 CE)

Great Satraps Mahakṣatrapa
- 35–415 CE
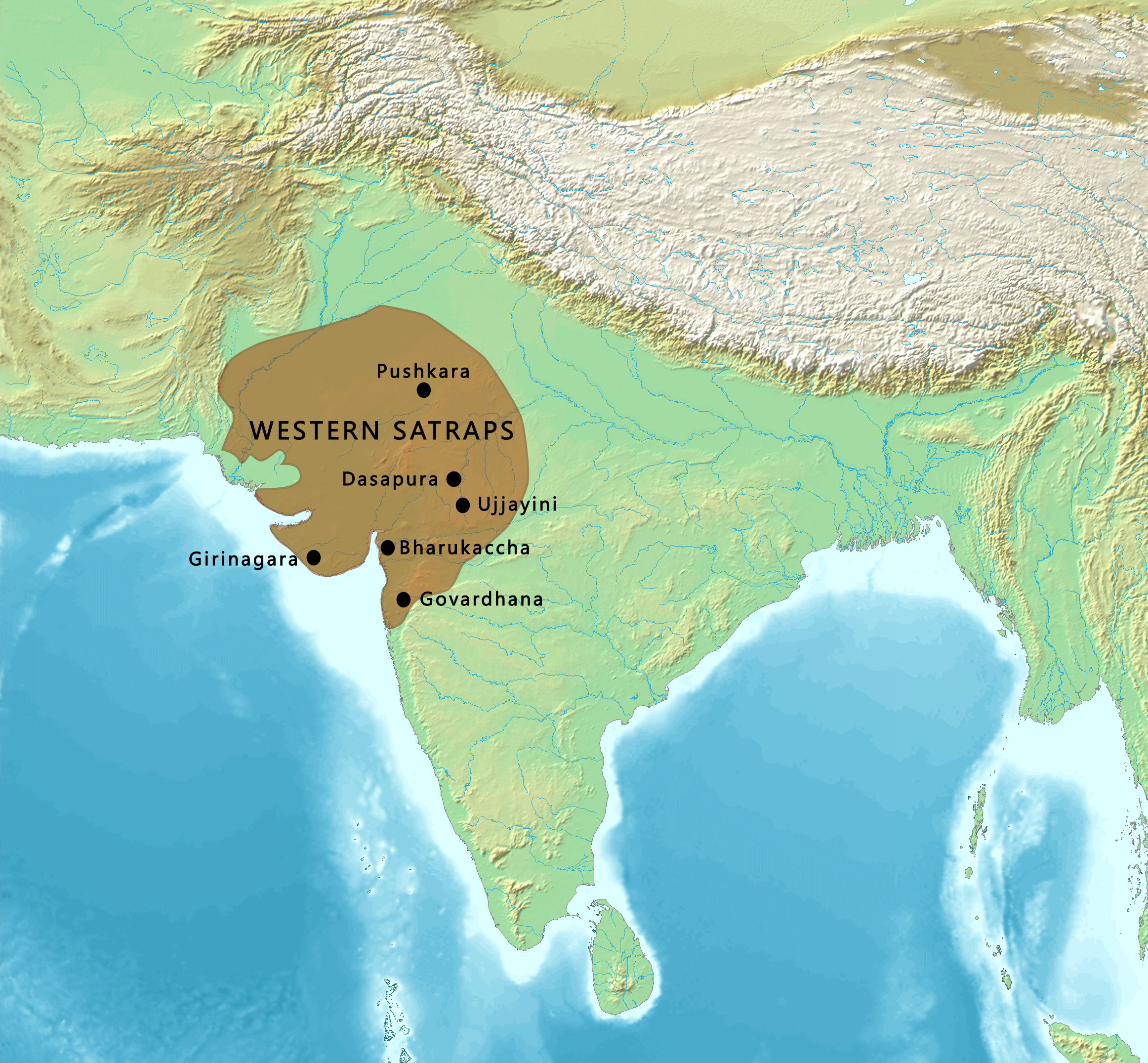
- Approximate territory of the Western Satraps (35–415) circa 350 CE.
- Capital: Ujjain; Bharuch; Minnagara
- Common languages: Pali (Kharoshthi script); Sanskrit, Maharashtri Prakrit (Brahmi script)
- Religion: Hinduism; Jainism; Buddhism
- Government: Monarchy
- Satrap
  - c. 35: Abhiraka
  - 388–415: Rudrasimha III
- Historical era: Antiquity
  - Established: 35
  - Disestablished: 415 CE
Preceded by
| Indo-Scythians |
| Malavas |
| Satavahana dynasty |
Succeeded by
| Gupta Empire |
| Vakataka dynasty |
| Kalachuris of Mahishmati |
| Traikutaka dynasty |
| Kingdom of Valabhi |
- Today part of: India; Pakistan

The Western Satraps, or Western Kshatrapas (Brahmi:, Mahakṣatrapa, "Great Satraps") were Indo-Scythian (Saka) rulers of the western and central parts of India (extending from Saurashtra in the south and Malwa in the east, covering modern-day Sindh, Gujarat, Maharashtra, Rajasthan and Madhya Pradesh states), between 35 and 415 CE. The Western Satraps were contemporaneous with the Kushans who ruled the northern part of the Indian subcontinent, and were possibly vassals of the Kushans. They were also contemporaneous with the Satavahana who ruled in Central India. They are called "Western Satraps" in modern historiography in order to differentiate them from the "Northern Satraps", who ruled in Punjab and Mathura until the 2nd century CE.

The power of the Western Satraps started to decline in the 2nd century CE after the Saka rulers were defeated by the Emperor Gautamiputra Satakarni of the Satavahana dynasty. After this, the Saka kingdom revived, but was ultimately defeated by Chandragupta II of the Gupta Empire in the 4th century CE.

== Name ==
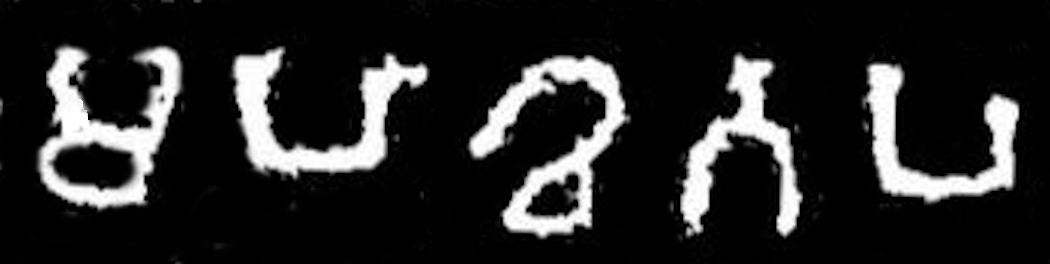
The rulers of the Western Satraps were called Mahākhatapa (𑀫𑀳𑀸𑀔𑀢𑀧, "Great Satrap") in their Brahmi script inscriptions, as here in a dedicatory inscription by Prime Minister Ayama in the name of his ruler Nahapana, Manmodi Caves, circa 100 CE. Nahapana was also attributed the titles of Raño ("King") and Sāmi ("Lord") conjointly.

They are named Western Satraps in contrast to the "Northern Satraps" who ruled around East Punjab and the area of Mathura, such as Rajuvula, and his successors under the Kushans, the "Great Satrap" Kharapallana and the "Satrap" Vanaspara.

Although they called themselves "Satraps" on their coins, leading to their modern designation of "Western Satraps", Ptolemy in his 2nd century "Geographia" still called them "Indo-Scythians". The word Kṣatrapa has the same origin as the word satrap and are both descended from Median xšaθrapāvan-, which means viceroy or governor of a province, and according to John Marshall, the word kṣatrapa means the viceroy of the "King of kings". The title of the Mahakṣatrapa or the "Great Satrap" was given to the ruling Satrap, and the title of kṣatrapa was given to the heir apparent. The western Kshatrapas were also known as Sakas to Indians.

The Sakas of Western India spoke the Saka language, also known as Khotanese as it is first attested in the Tarim Basin.

== History ==
=== First expansion: Kshaharata dynasty (1st century CE) ===
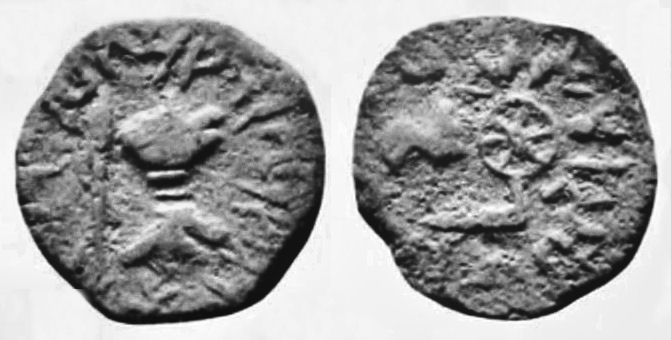
Coin of Bhumaka (?–119). Obv: Arrow, pellet, and thunderbolt. Kharoshthi inscription Chaharasada Chatrapasa Bhumakasa: "Ksaharata Satrap Bhumaka". Rev: Capital of a pillar with seated lion with upraised paw, and wheel (dharmachakra). Brahmi inscription: Kshaharatasa Kshatrapasa Bhumakasa.

The Western Satraps are thought to have started with the rather short-lived Kshaharata dynasty (also called Chaharada, Khaharata or Khakharata depending on sources). The term Kshaharata is also known from the 6 CE Taxila copper plate inscription, in which it qualifies the Indo-Scythian ruler Liaka Kusulaka. The Nasik inscription of the 19th year of Sri Pulamavi also mentions the Khakharatavasa, or Kshaharata race.

The earliest Kshaharata for whom there is evidence is Abhiraka, whose rare coins are known. He was succeeded by Bhumaka, father of Nahapana, who only used on his coins the title of Satrap, and not that of Raja or Raño (king). Nahapana's rule is variously dated to 24-70 CE, 66-71 CE, or 119–124 CE, according to one of his coins, which bear Buddhist symbols, such as the eight-spoked wheel (dharmachakra), or the lion seated on a capital, a representation of a pillar of Ashoka.

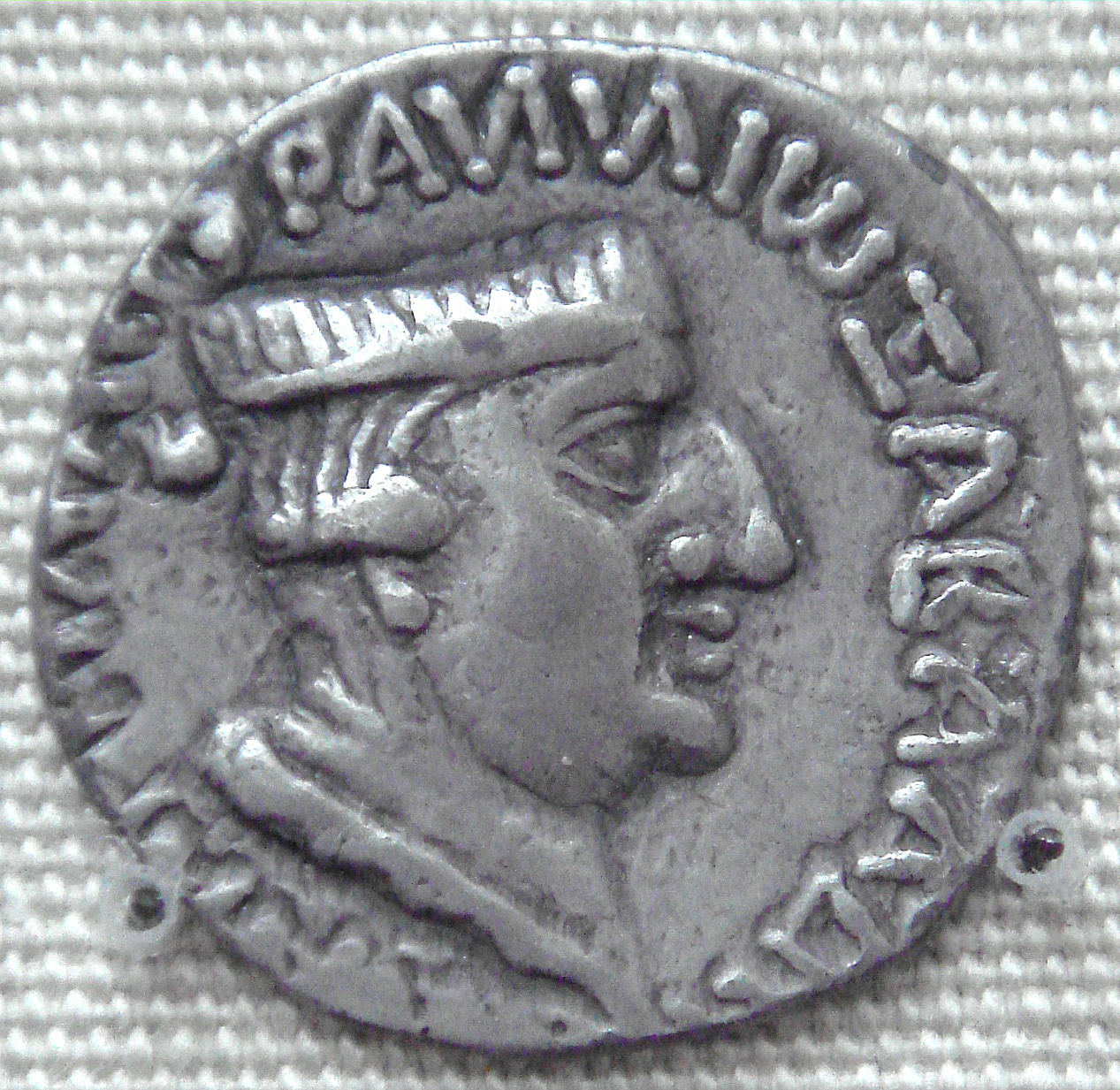
Coin of Nahapana (whose rule is variously dated to 24-70 CE, 66-71 CE, or 119–124 CE), a direct derivation from Indo-Greek coinage. British Museum.

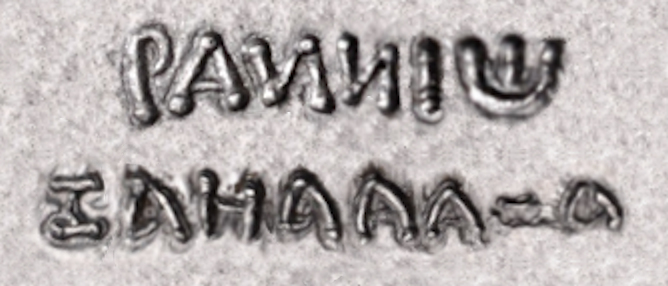
The Greco-Prakrit title "RANNIO KSAHARATA" ("ΡΑΝΝΙω ΞΑΗΑΡΑΤΑ(Ϲ)", Prakrit for "King Kshaharata" rendered in corrupted Greek letters) on the obverse of the coinage of Nahapana.

Location of Western Satrap inscriptions in Buddhist rock-cut caves, indicating the southern extent of their territory, circa 120 CE, and main neighbouring polities at that time.

Nahapana succeeded him, and became a very powerful ruler. He occupied portions of the Satavahana Empire in western and central India. Nahapana held sway over Malwa, Southern Gujarat, and Northern Konkan, from Bharuch to Sopara and the Nasik and Poona districts. At that time, the area northwest of the Western Satraps in Baluchistan was ruled by the Paratarajas, an Indo-Parthian polity, while the Kushans were expanding their empire in the North.

His son-in-law, the Saka Ushavadata (married to his daughter Dakshamitra), is known from inscriptions in Nasik and Karle and Junnar (Manmodi Caves, inscription of the year 46) to have been viceroy of Nahapana, ruling over the southern part of his territory.

Nahapana established the silver coinage of the Kshatrapas.

Circa 120 CE, the Western Satraps are known to have allied with the Uttamabhadras in order to repulse an attack by the Malavas, whom they finally crushed. The claim appears in an inscription at the Nashik Caves, made by the Nahapana's viceroy Ushavadata:

...And by order of the lord I went to release the chief of the Uttamabhadras, who had been besieged for the rainy season by the Malayas, and those Malayas fled at the mere roar (of my approaching) as it were, and were all made prisoners of the Uttamabhadra warriors.

— Inscription in Cave No.10 of the Nashik Caves.

==== Support of Indian religions ====
An important inscription related to Nahapana in the Great Chaitya at Karla Caves shows his support of Buddhism and Hinduism:

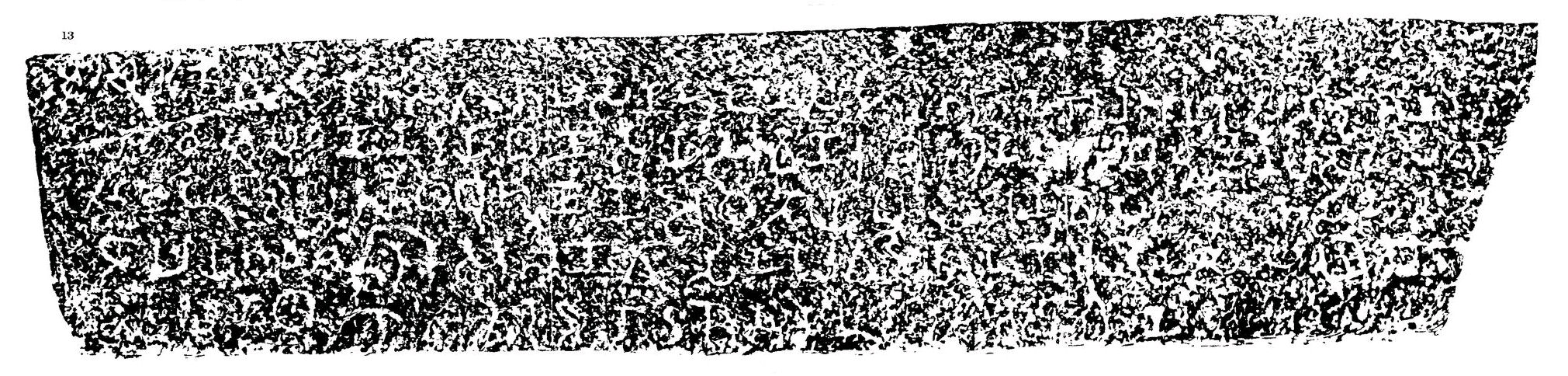
Karla Caves, inscription of Nahapana.

Success!! By Ushabadata, the son of Dinaka and the son-in-law of the king, the Kshaharata, the Kshatrapa Nahapana, who gave three hundred thousand cows, who made gifts of gold and a tirtha on the river Banasa, who gave to the Devas and Brahmanas sixteen villages, who at the pure tirtha Prabhasa gave eight wives to the Brahmanas, and who also fed annually a hundred thousand Brahmanas- there has been given the village of Karajika for the support of the ascetics living in the caves at Valuraka without any distinction of sect or origin, for all who would keep the varsha.

— Inscription of Nahapana, Karla Caves.

==== Construction of Buddhist caves ====
The Western Satraps are known for the construction and dedication of numerous Buddhist caves in Central India, particularly in Maharashtra and Gujarat. It is thought that Nahapana ruled at least 35 years in the region of Karla, Junnar and Nasik, giving him ample time for construction work there.

Numerous inscriptions in the caves are known, which were made by the family of Nahapana: six inscriptions in Nasik Caves, one inscription at Karla Caves, and one by Nahapana's minister in the Manmodi Caves at Junnar. At the same time, "Yavanas", Greeks or Indo-Greeks, also left donative inscriptions at the Nasik Caves, Karla Caves, Lenyadri and Manmodi Caves.

===== Great Chaitya hall at Karla Caves =====
In particular, the chaitya cave complex of the Karla Caves, the largest in South Asia, was constructed and dedicated in 120 CE by the Western Satraps ruler Nahapana.

Great Chaitya hall at Karla

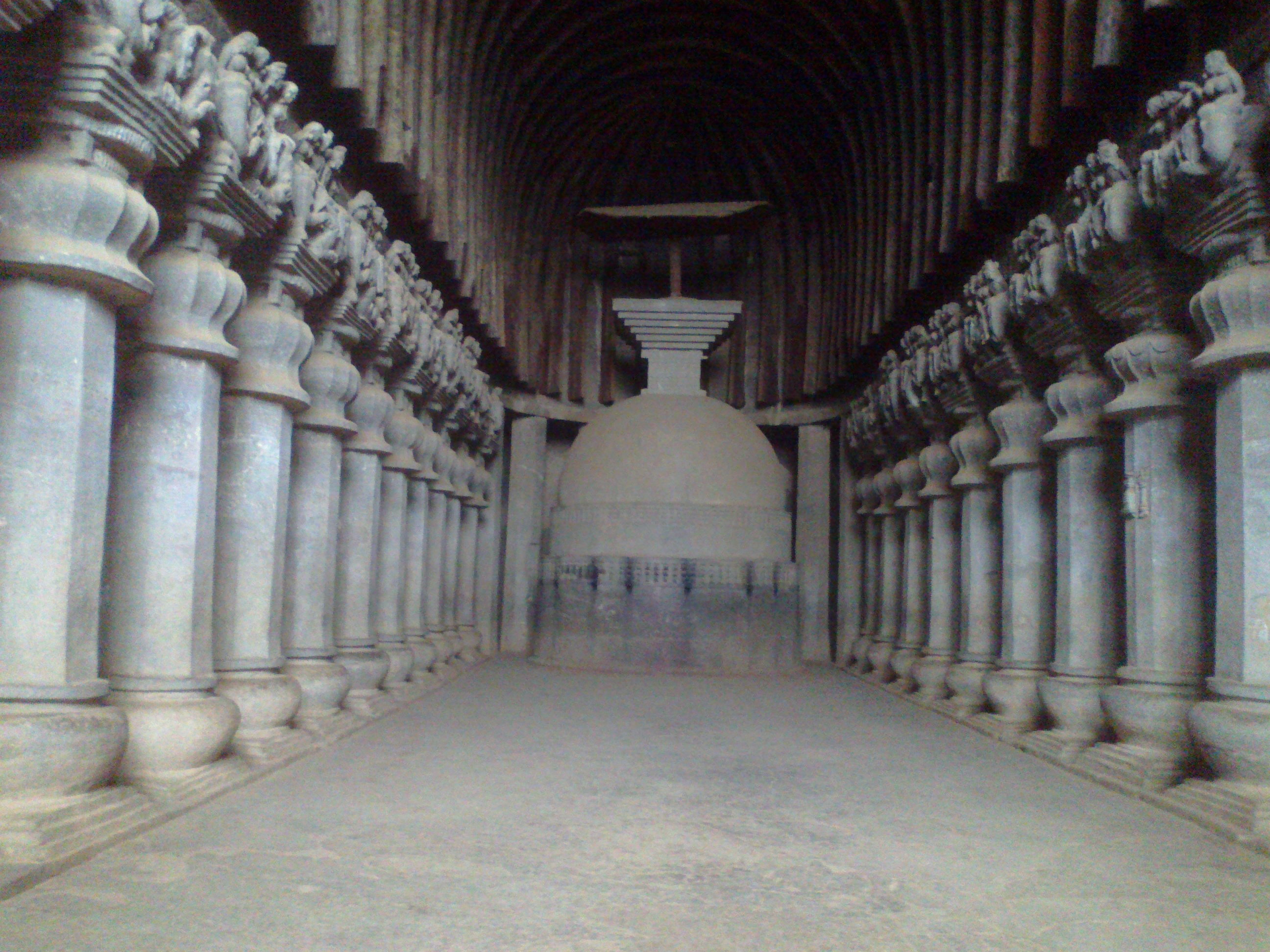
Hall of the Great Chaitya Cave at Karla (120 CE)

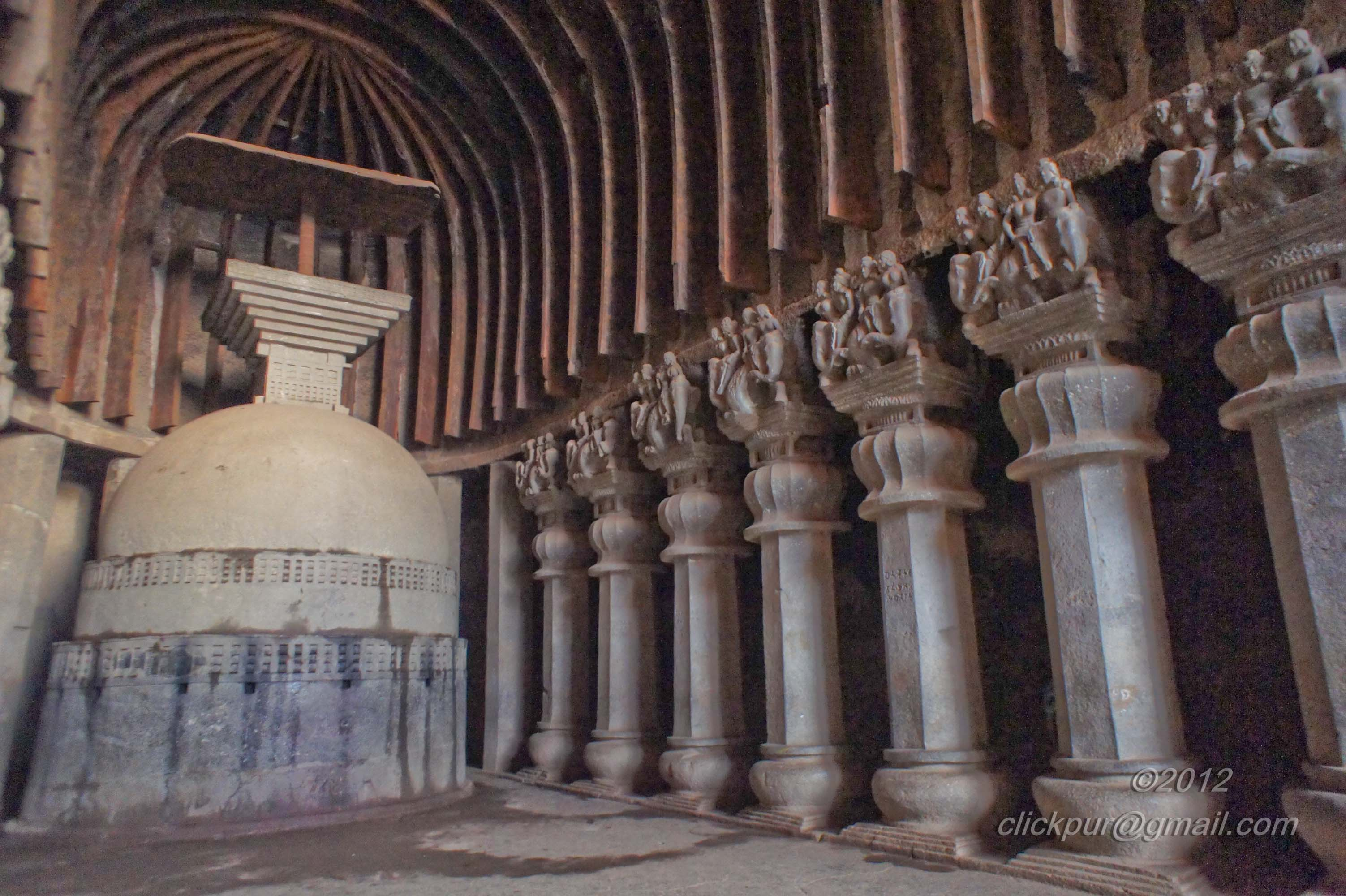
Right row of columns

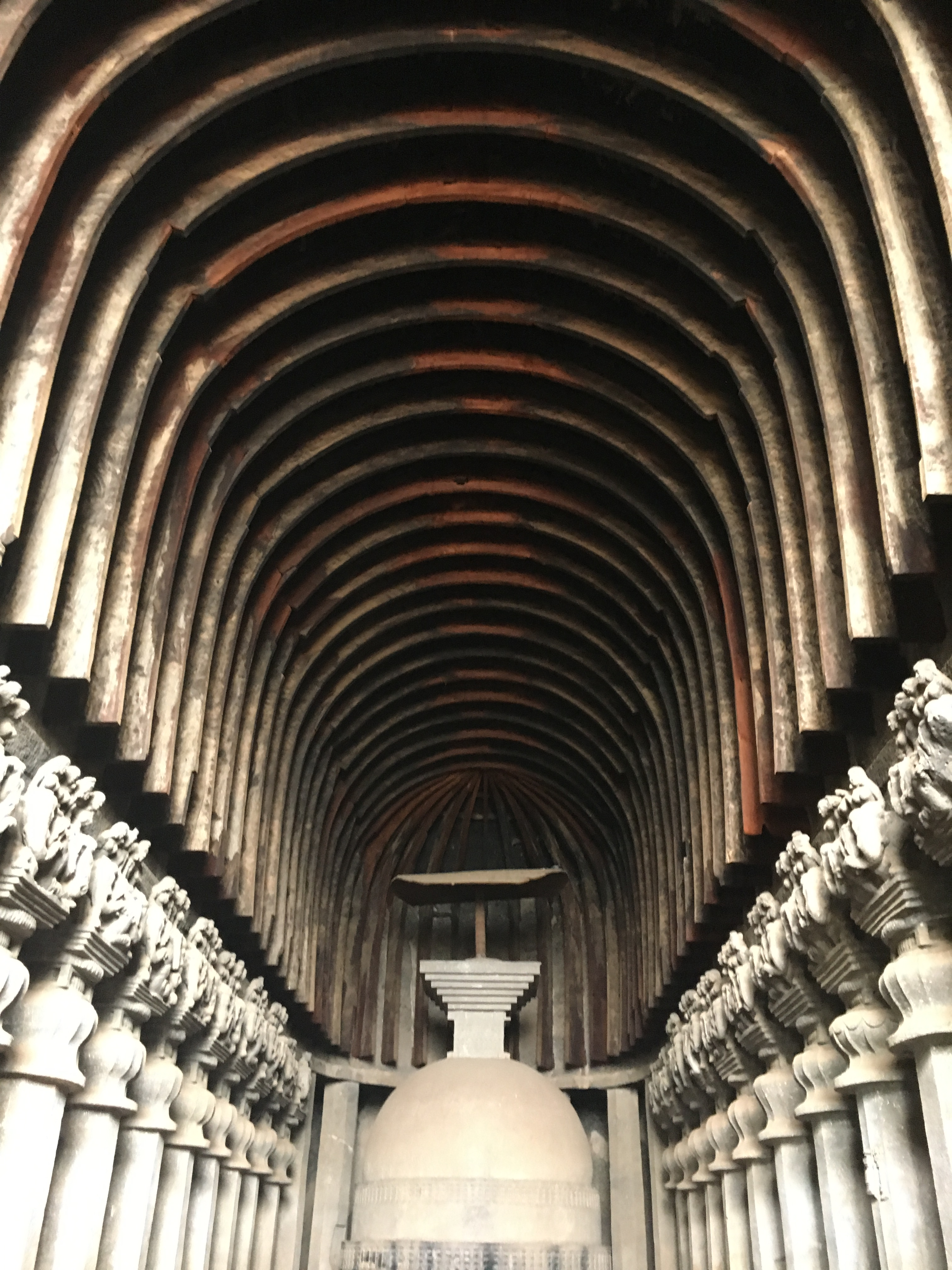
Chaitya roof

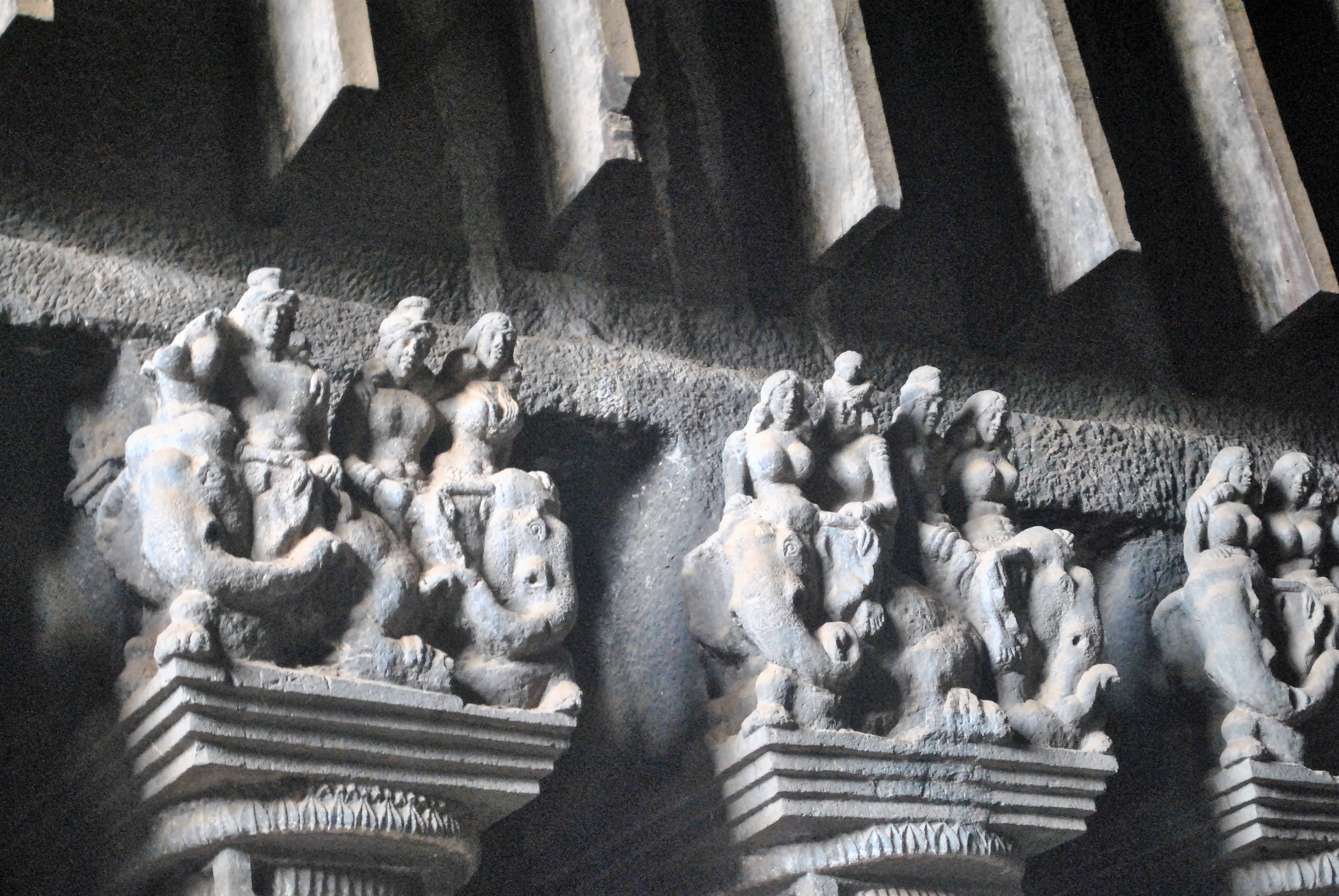
Capitals

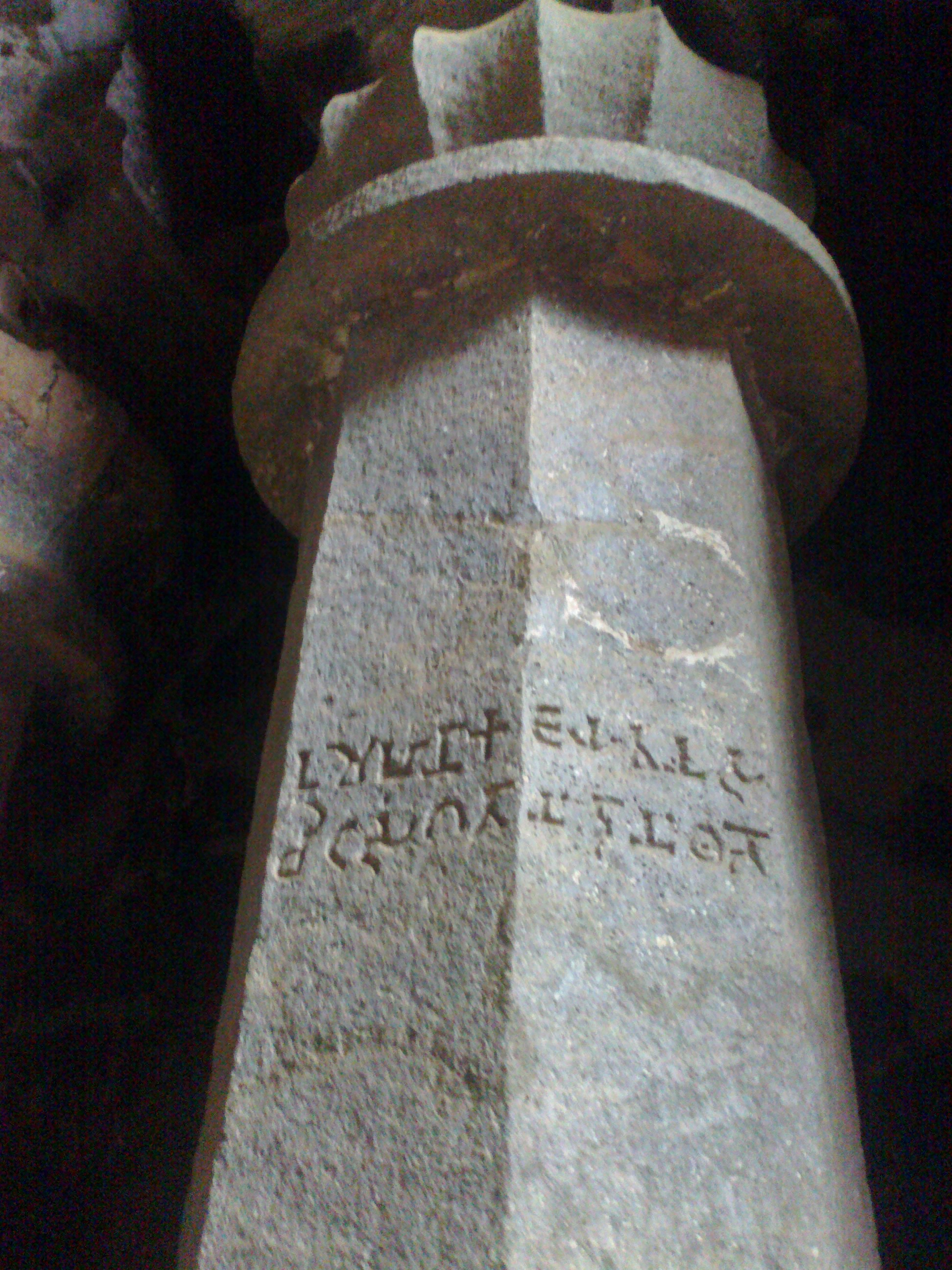
Donative inscription by a Yavana ("Indo-Greek") named Vitasamghata.

===== Cave No.10 of Nasik, the 'Nahapana Vihara' =====
Parts of the Nasik Caves, also called Pandavleni Caves, were also carved during the time of Nahapana.

The inscriptions of cave no.10 in the Nasik Caves near Nasik, reveal that in 105-106 CE, Kshatrapas defeated the Satavahanas after which Kshatrapa Nahapana’s son-in-law and Dinika's son- Ushavadata donated 3000 gold coins for this cave as well as for the food and clothing of the monks. Usabhdatta's wife (Nahapana's daughter), Dakshmitra also donated one cave for the Buddhist monks. Cave 10 - 'Nahapana Vihara' is spacious with 16 rooms.

Nasik Caves, cave No. 10

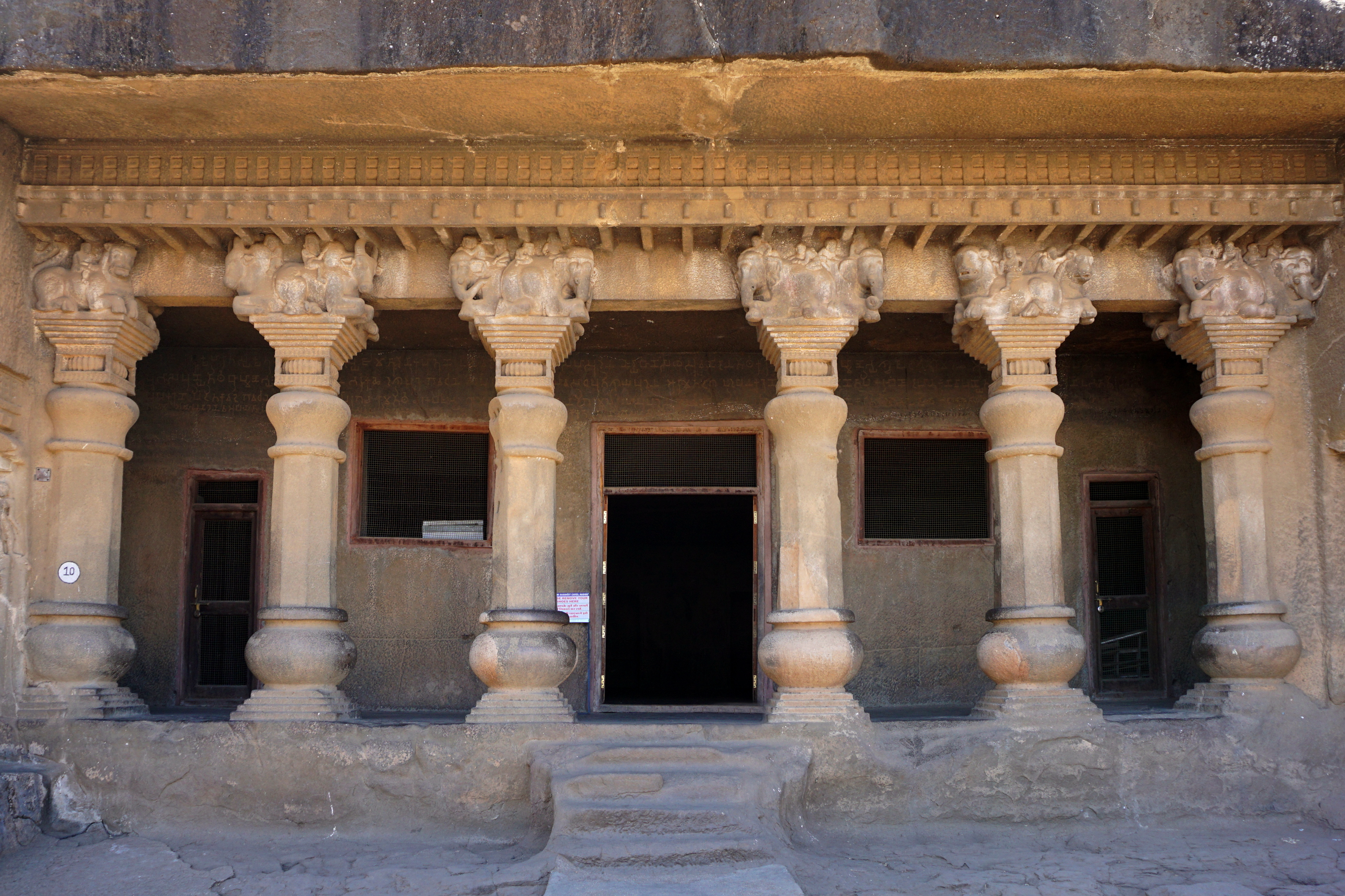
Front

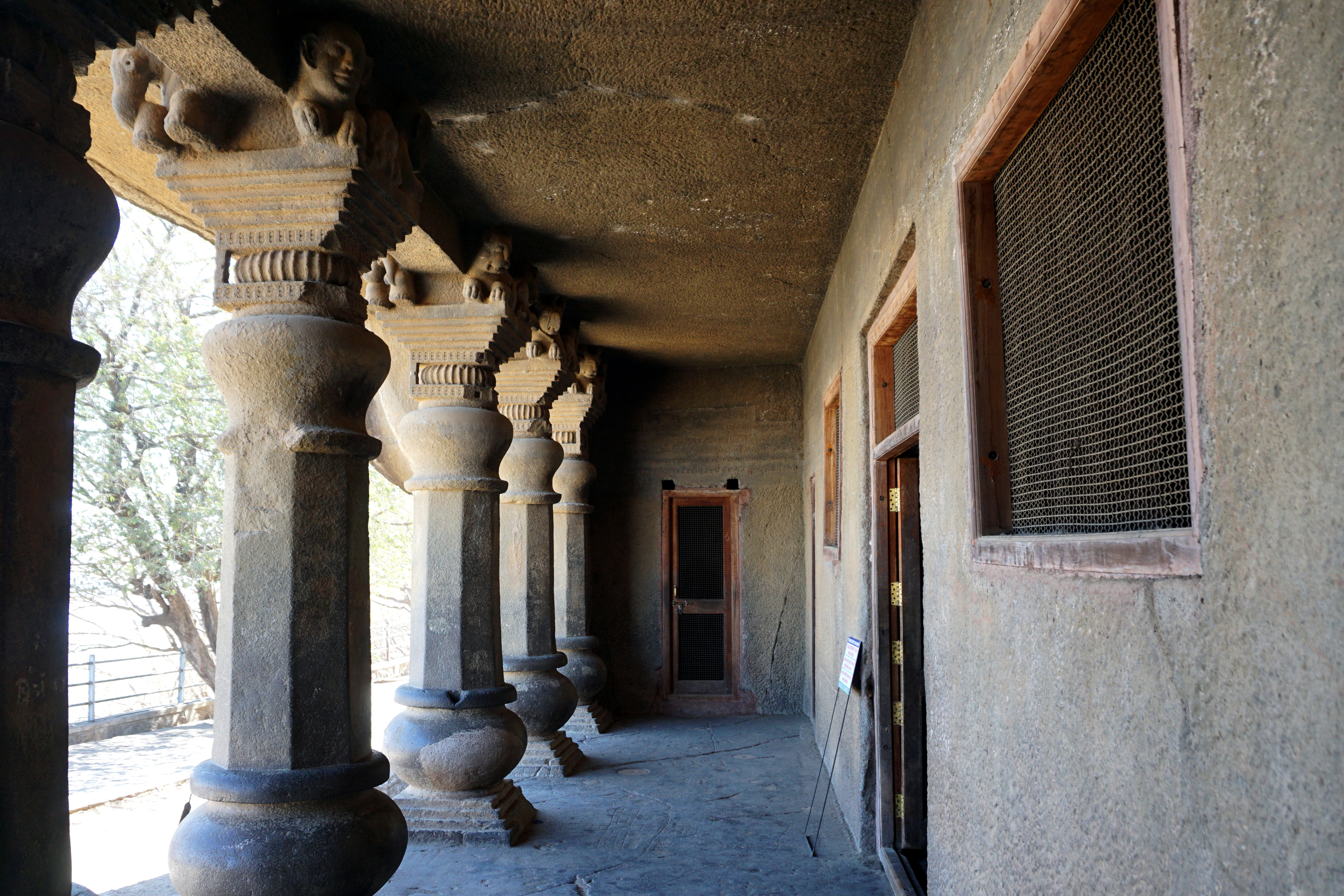
Veranda

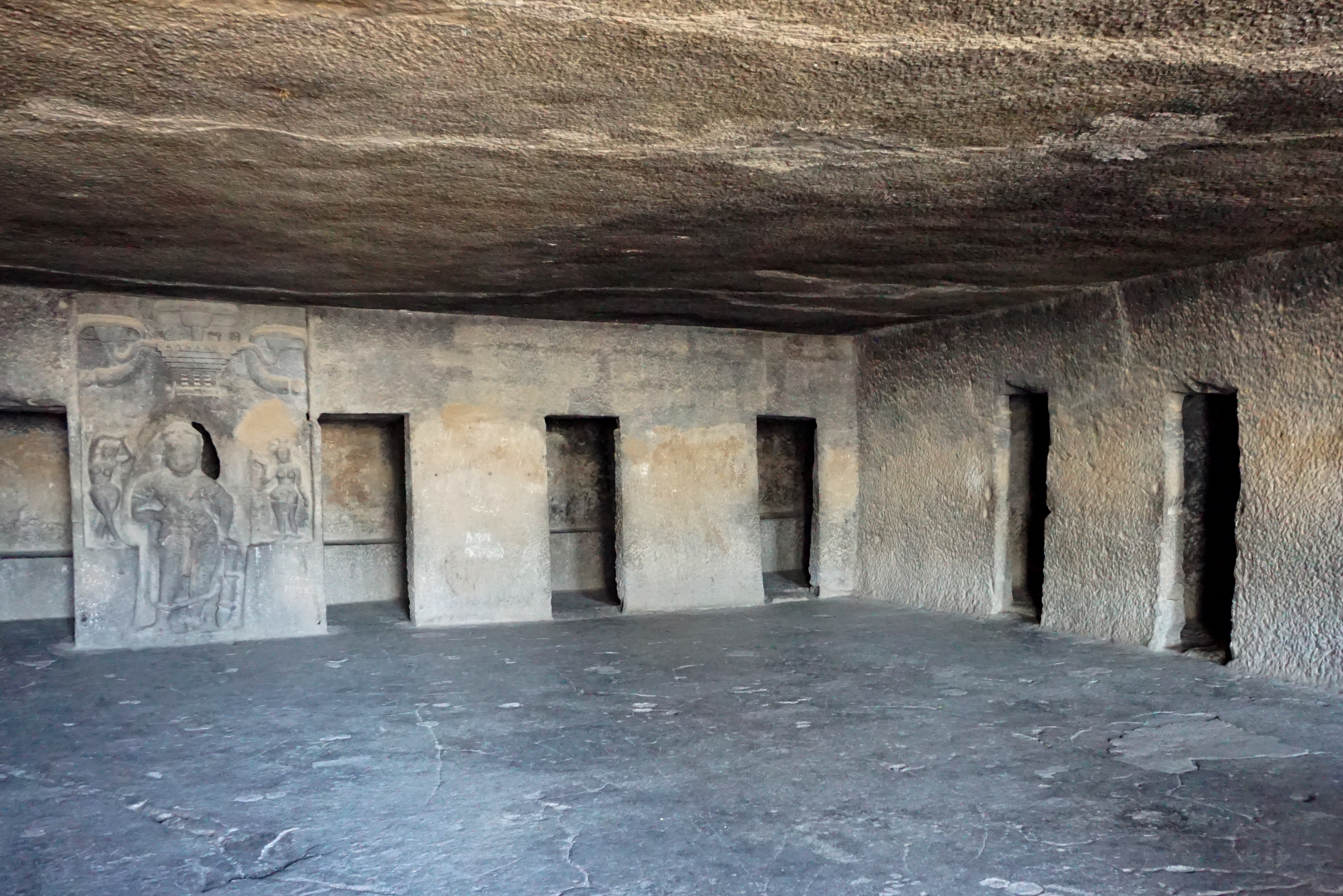
Interior

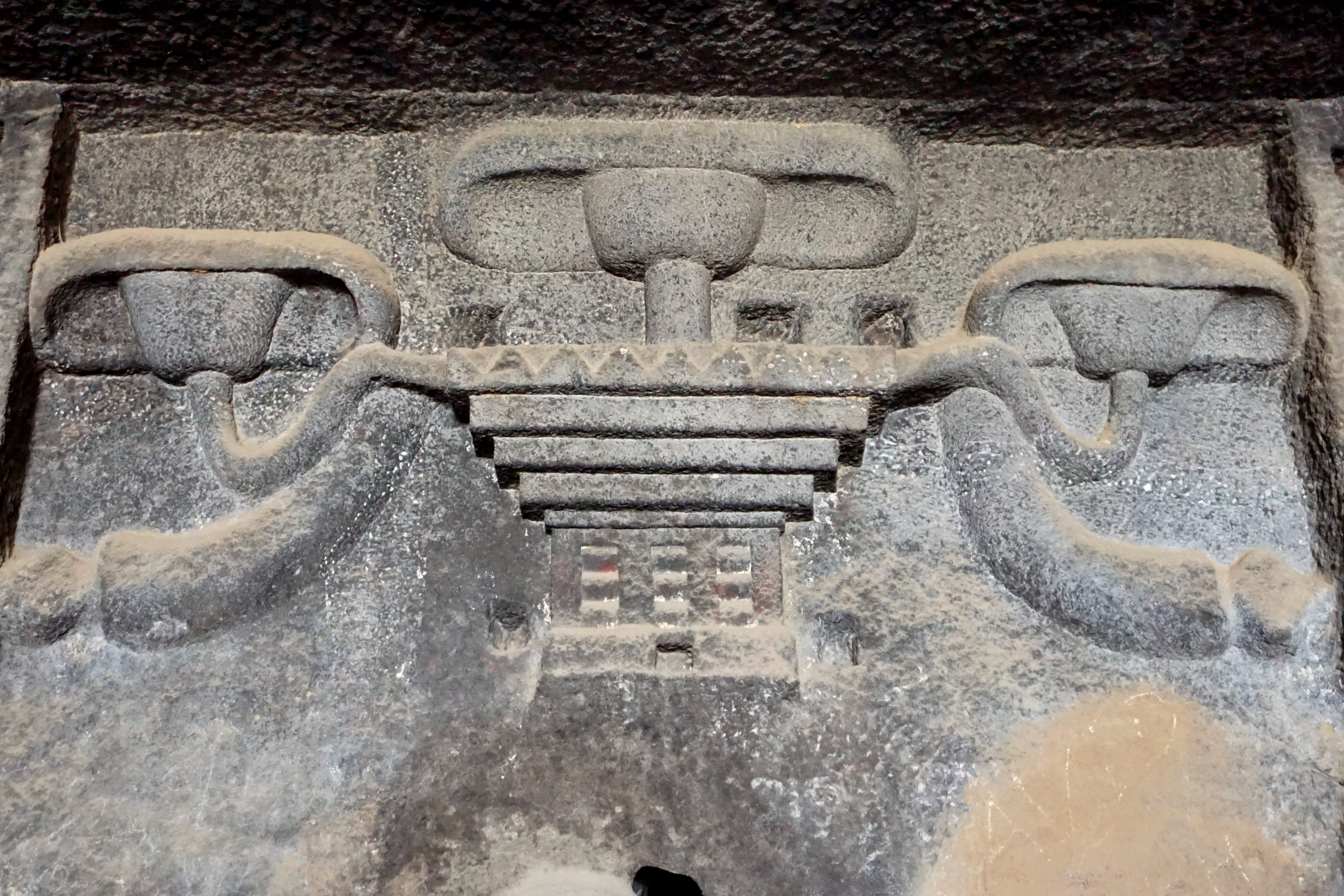
Chaitya and Umbrellas

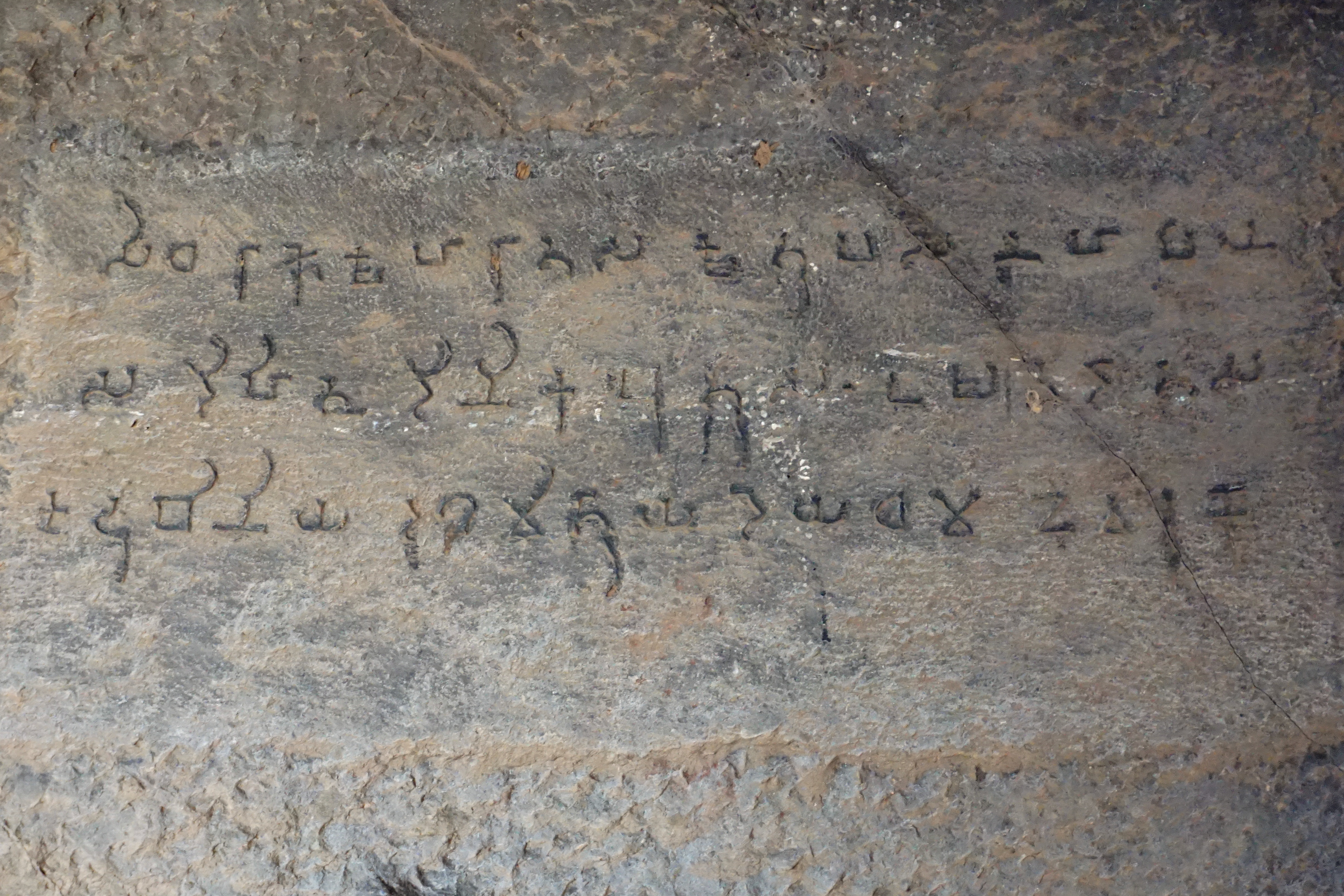
Inscription

Two inscriptions in Cave 10 mention the building and the gift of the whole cave to the Samgha by Ushavadata, the Saka son-in-law and viceroy of Nahapana:

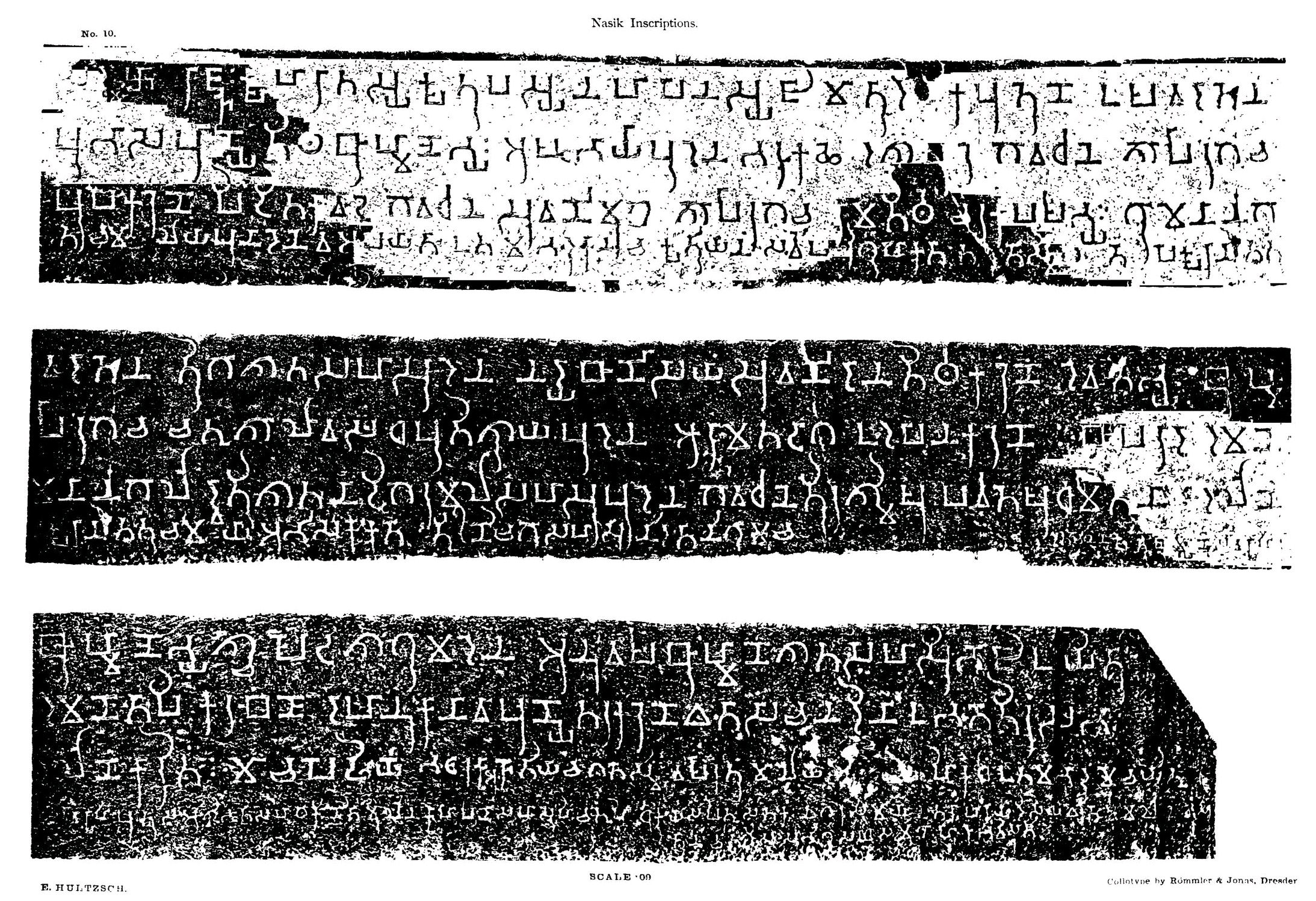
Nasik Cave inscription No.10. of Nahapana, Cave No.10.

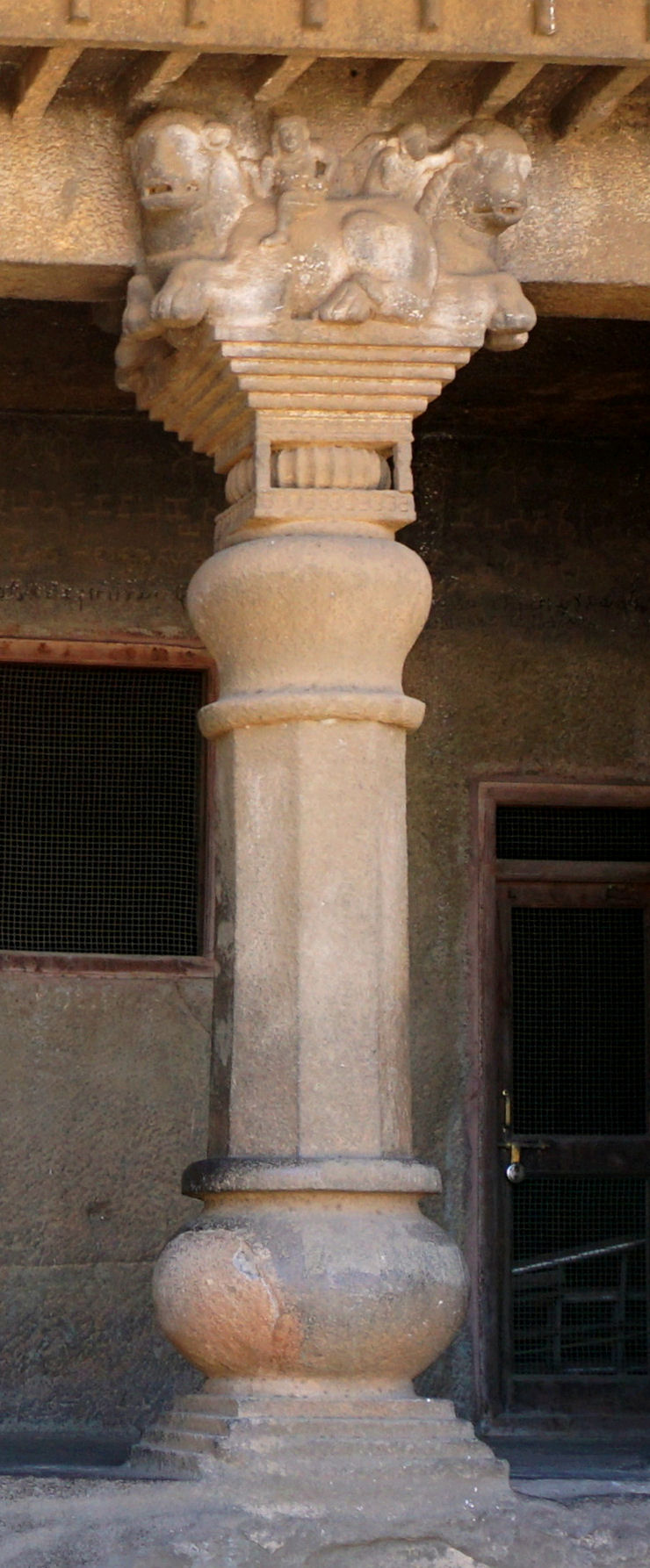
One of the pillars built by Ushavadata, viceroy of Nahapana, circa 120 CE, Nasik Caves, cave No10.

Success! Ushavadata, son of Dinika, son-in-law of king Nahapana, the Kshaharata Kshatrapa, (...) inspired by (true) religion, in the Trirasmi hills at Govardhana, has caused this cave to be made and these cisterns.

— Inscription No.10 of Nahapana, Cave No.10, Nasik

Success! In the year 42, in the month Vesakha, Ushavadata, son of Dinika, son-in-law of king Nahapana, the Kshaharata Kshatrapa, has bestowed this cave on the Samgha generally....

— Inscription No.12 of Nahapana, Cave No.10, Nasik

According to the inscriptions, Ushavadata accomplished various charities and conquests on behalf of his father-in-law. He constructed rest-houses, gardens and tanks at Bharukachchha (Broach), Dashapura (Mandasor in Malwa), Govardhana (near Nasik) and Shorparaga (Sopara in the Thana district).

===== Junnar dedication =====
A dedication in the Lenyadri complex of the Junnar caves (inscription No. 26 in Cave VI of the Bhimasankar group of caves), mentions a gift by Nahapana's prime minister Ayama in the "year 46":

The meritorious gift.... of Ayama of the Vachhasagotra, prime minister of the King Mahakshatrapa the lord Nahapana

— Junnar inscription No. 26, 124 CE

This inscription, the last one of the reign of Nahapana, suggests that Nahapana may have become an independent ruler since he is described as a King.

==== International trade: the Periplus of the Erythraean Sea ====
Nahapana is mentioned in the Periplus of the Erythraean Sea under the name Nambanus, as ruler of the area around Barigaza:

Beyond the gulf of Baraca is that of Barygaza and the coast of the country of Ariaca, which is the beginning of the Kingdom of Nambanus and of all India. That part of it lying inland and adjoining Scythia is called Abiria, but the coast is called Syrastrene. It is a fertile country, yielding wheat and rice and sesame oil and clarified butter, cotton and the Indian cloths made therefrom, of the coarser sorts. Very many cattle are pastured there, and the men are of great stature and black in color. The metropolis of this country is Minnagara, from which much cotton cloth is brought down to Barygaza.

— Periplus of the Erythraean Sea, Chap. 41

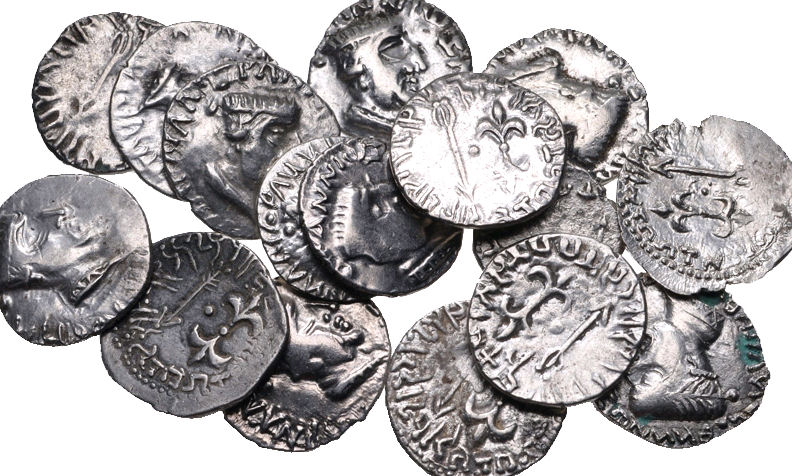
Nahapana coin hoard.

Under the Western Satraps, Barigaza was one of the main centers of Roman trade with India. The Periplus describes the many goods exchanged:

There are imported into this market-town (Barigaza), wine, Italian preferred, also Laodicean and Arabian; copper, tin, and lead; coral and topaz; thin clothing and inferior sorts of all kinds; bright-colored girdles a cubit wide; storax, sweet clover, flint glass, realgar, antimony, gold and silver coin, on which there is a profit when exchanged for the money of the country; and ointment, but not very costly and not much. And for the King there are brought into those places very costly vessels of silver, singing boys, beautiful maidens for the harem, fine wines, thin clothing of the finest weaves, and the choicest ointments. There are exported from these places spikenard, costus, bdellium, ivory, agate and carnelian, lycium, cotton cloth of all kinds, silk cloth, mallow cloth, yarn, long pepper and such other things as are brought here from the various market-towns. Those bound for this market-town from Egypt make the voyage favorably about the month of July, that is Epiphi.

— Periplus of the Erythraean Sea, Chapter 49.

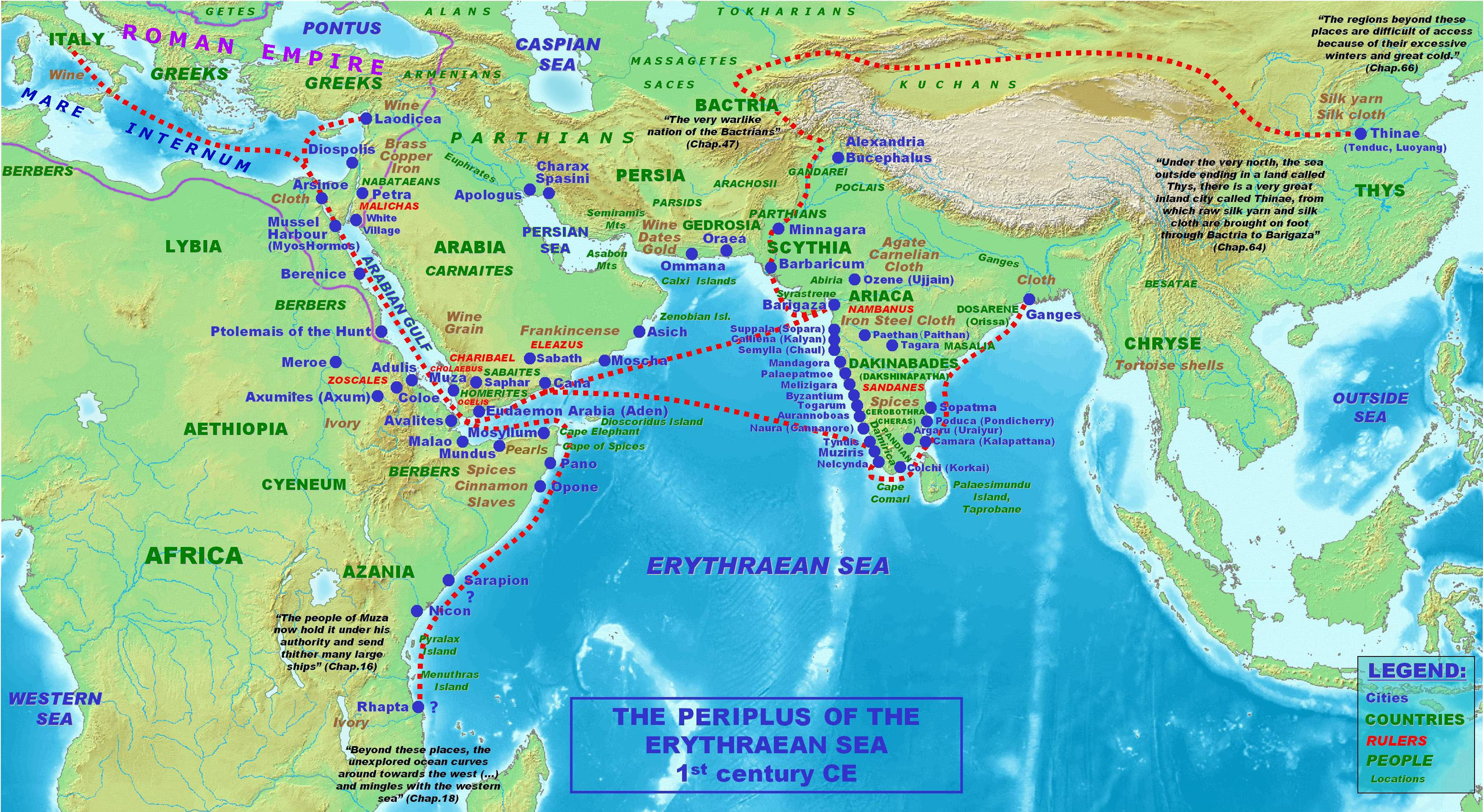
The Western Satraps under Nahapana, with their harbour of Barigaza, were among the main actors of the 1st century CE international trade according to the Periplus of the Erythraean Sea.

Goods were also brought down in quantity from Ujjain, the capital of the Western Satraps:

Inland from this place and to the east, is the city called Ozene, formerly a royal capital; from this place are brought down all things needed for the welfare of the country about Barygaza, and many things for our trade: agate and carnelian, Indian muslins and mallow cloth, and much ordinary cloth.

— Periplus of the Erythraean Sea, Chapter 48.

Some ships were also fitted out from Barigaza, to export goods westward across the Indian Ocean:

Ships are also customarily fitted out from the places across this sea, from Ariaca and Barygaza, bringing to these far-side market-towns the products of their own places; wheat, rice, clarified butter, sesame oil, cotton cloth (the monache and the sagmatogene), and girdles, and honey from the reed called sacchari. Some make the voyage especially to these market-towns, and others exchange their cargoes while sailing along the coast.

— Periplus of the Erythraean Sea, Chapter 14.

===== Pompei Lakshmi =====
An Indian statuette, the Pompeii Lakshmi, was found in the ruins of Pompei and is thought to have been the result of Indo-Roman trade relations in the 1st century CE. There is a possibility that the statuette found its way to the west during the rule of Western Satrap Nahapana in the Bhokardan area, and was shipped to Rome from the port of Barigaza.

==== Defeat by Gautamiputra Satakarni ====
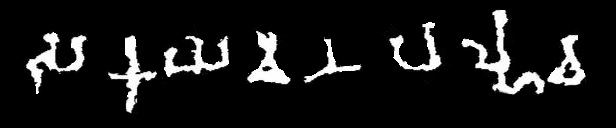
The "Saka-Yavana-Palhava" (Brahmi script: 𑀲𑀓 𑀬𑀯𑀦 𑀧𑀮𑁆𑀳𑀯) defeated by Gautamiputra Satakarni, mentioned in the Nasik cave 3 inscription of Queen Gotami Balasiri (end of line 5 of the inscription).

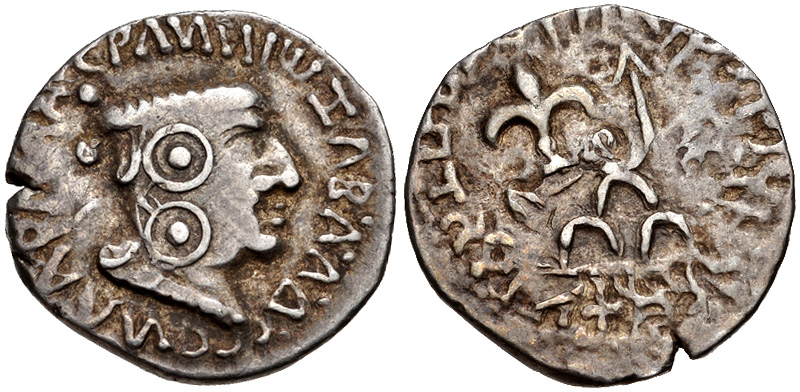
Coin of Gautamiputra Yajna Satakarni struck over a drachm of Nahapana. Circa 167-196 CE. Ujjain symbol and three arched mountain symbol struck respectively on the obverse and reverse of a drachm of Nahapana.

Nahapana and Ushavadata were ultimately defeated by the powerful Satavahana king Gautamiputra Satakarni. Gautamiputra drove the Sakas from Malwa and Western Maharashtra, forcing Nahapana west to Gujarat. His victory is known from the fact that Gautamiputra restruck many of Nahapana's coins (such a hoard was found in Jogalthambi, Nashik District),) and that he claimed victory on them in an inscription at Cave No. 3 of the Pandavleni Caves in Nashik:

Gautamiputra Satakarni (…) who crushed down the pride and conceit of the Kshatriyas; who destroyed the Sakas (Western Satraps), Yavanas (Indo-Greeks) and Pahlavas (Indo-Parthians), who rooted out the Khakharata family (the Kshaharata family of Nahapana); who restored the glory of the Satavahana race.

— Inscription of Queen Mother Gautami Balashri at Cave No. 3 of the Pandavleni Caves in Nashik.

==== Colonization of Java and Sumatra ====
It seems that the Indian colonisation of the islands of Java and Sumatra took place during the time of the Western Satraps. People may have fled the sub-continent due to the conflicts there. Some foundation legends of Java describe the leader of the colonists as Aji Saka, a prince from Gujarat, at the beginning of the Shaka era (which is also the Java era).

=== Kardamaka dynasty, family of Castana (1st–4th century) ===
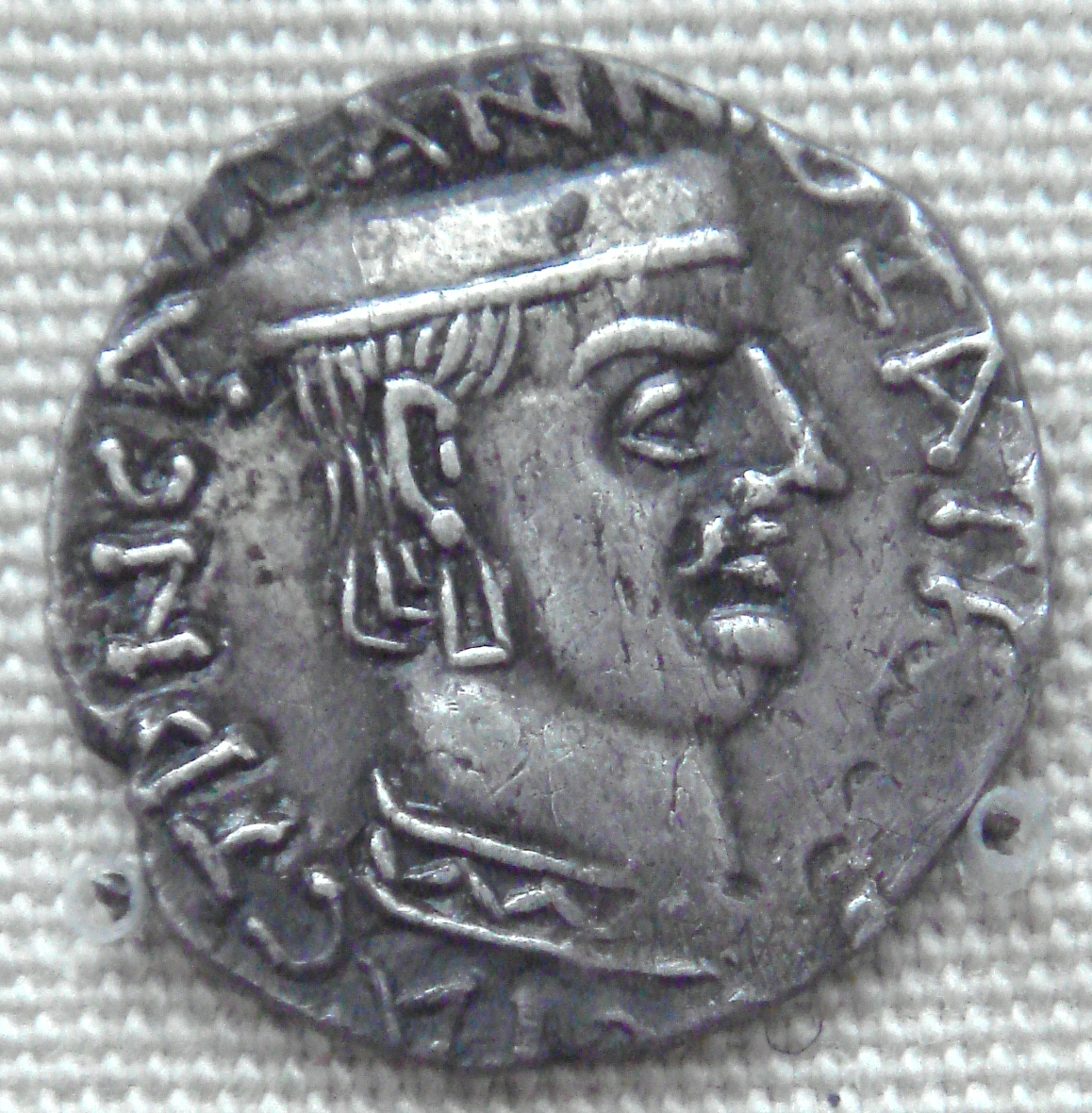
Coin of the Western Satrap Chastana (c. 130 CE). Obv: King in profile. The legend typically reads "PANNIΩ IATPAΠAC CIASTANCA" (corrupted Greek script), transliteration of the Prakrit Raño Kshatrapasa Castana: "King and Satrap Castana".

A new dynasty, called the Bhadramukhas or Kardamaka dynasty, was established by the "Satrap" Castana. The date of Castana is not certain, but many believe his reign started in the year 78 CE, thus making him the founder of the Saka era. This is consistent with the fact that his descendants (who we know used the Saka era on their coins and inscriptions) would use the date of their founder as their era. Castana was satrap of Ujjain during that period. A statue found in Mathura together with statues of the Kushan king Kanishka and Vima Taktu, and bearing the name "Shastana" is often attributed to Castana himself, and suggests Castana may have been a feudatory of the Kushans. Conversely, the Rabatak inscription also claims Kushan dominion over Western Satrap territory (by mentioning Kushan control over the capital Ujjain) during the reign of Kanishka (c. 127–150 CE).

==== Territory under Chastana ====
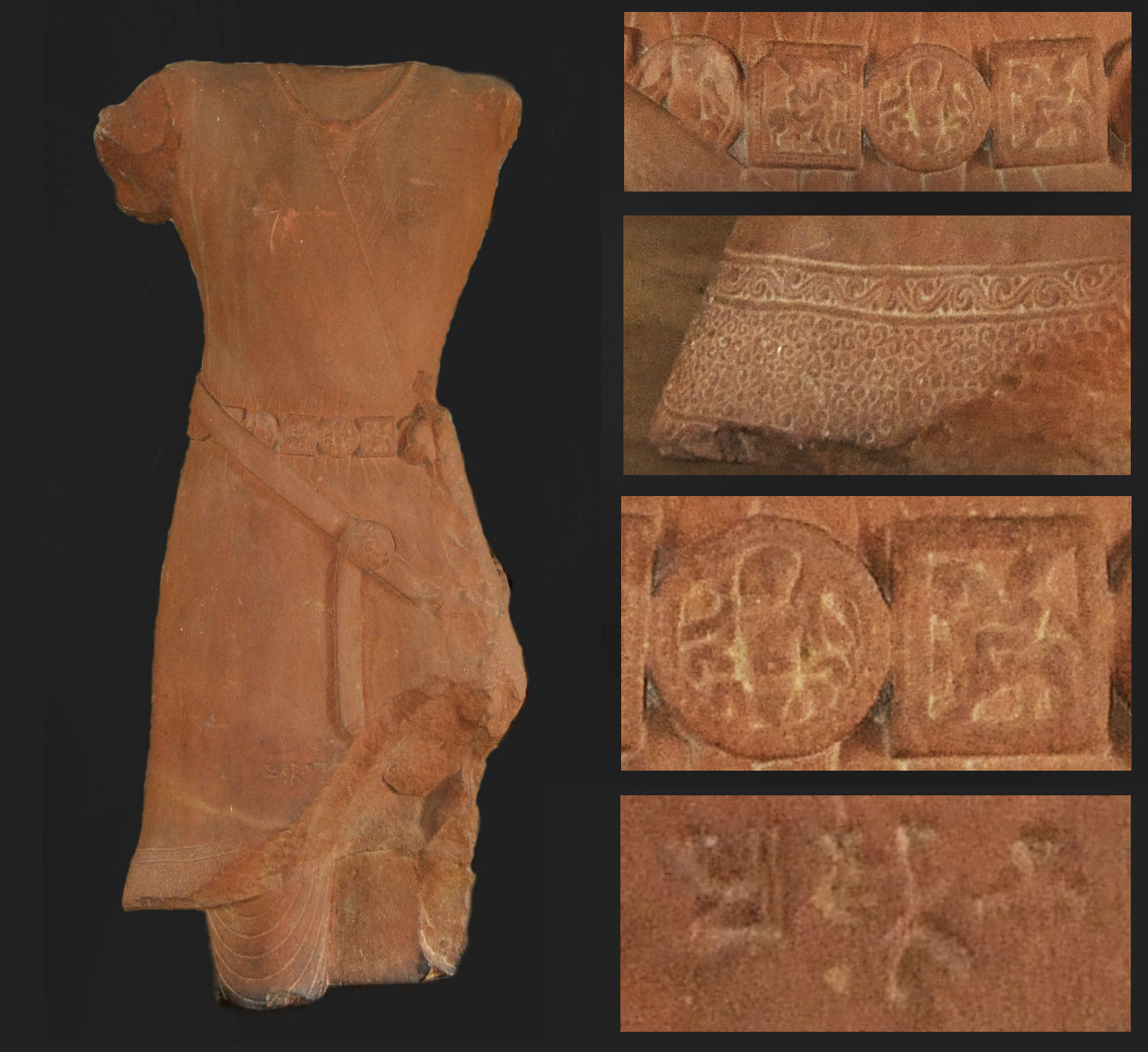
Statue of Chastana, with costume details. The belt displays designs of horsemen and tritons/anguipeds, the coat has a highly ornate hem. Inscription "Shastana" (Middle Brahmi script: Ṣa-sta-na). Mathura Museum.

The territory of the Western Satraps at the time of Chastana is described extensively by the geographer Ptolemy in his "Geographia", where he qualifies them as "Indo-Scythians". He describes this territory as starting from Patalene in the West, to Ujjain in the east ("Ozena-Regia Tiastani", "Ozene/Ujjain, capital of king Chastana"), and beyond Barigaza in the south.

Moreover the region which is next to the western part of India, is called Indoscythia. A part of this region around the (Indus) river mouth is Patalena, above which is Abiria. That which is about the mouth of the Indus and the Canthicolpus bay is called Syrastrena. (...) In the island formed by this river are the cities Pantala, Barbaria. (...) The Larica region of Indoscythia is located eastward from the swamp near the sea, in which on the west of the Namadus river is the interior city of Barygaza emporium. On the east side of the river (...) Ozena-Regia Tiastani (...) Minnagara.

— Ptolemy, Geographia, Book Seven, Chapter I

==== Rudradaman I (130-150 CE) ====
===== Victory against the Satavahanas =====
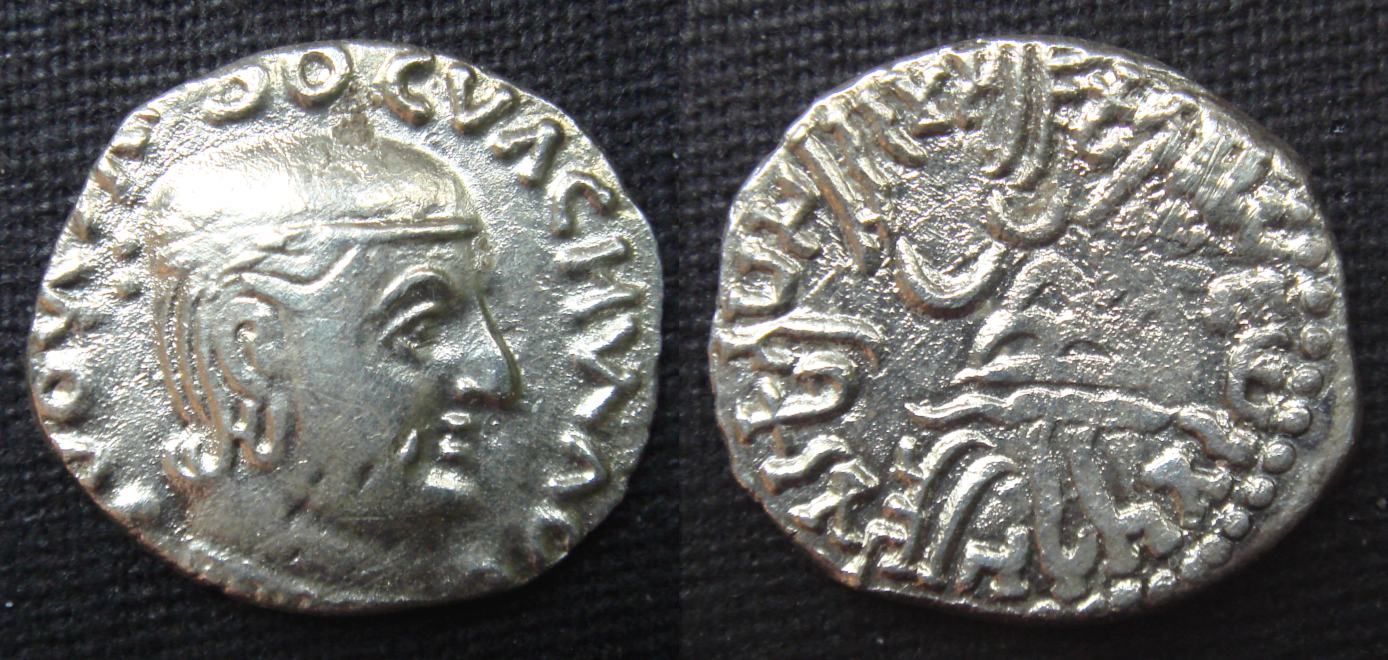
Silver coin of Rudradaman I (130–150). Obv: Bust of Rudradaman, with corrupted Greek legend "OVONIΛOOCVΛCHΛNO". Rev: Three-arched hill or Chaitya with river, crescent and sun. Brahmi legend: Rajno Ksatrapasa Jayadamasaputrasa Rajno Mahaksatrapasa Rudradamasa: "King and Great Satrap Rudradaman, son of King and Satrap Jayadaman" 16mm, 2.0 grams.

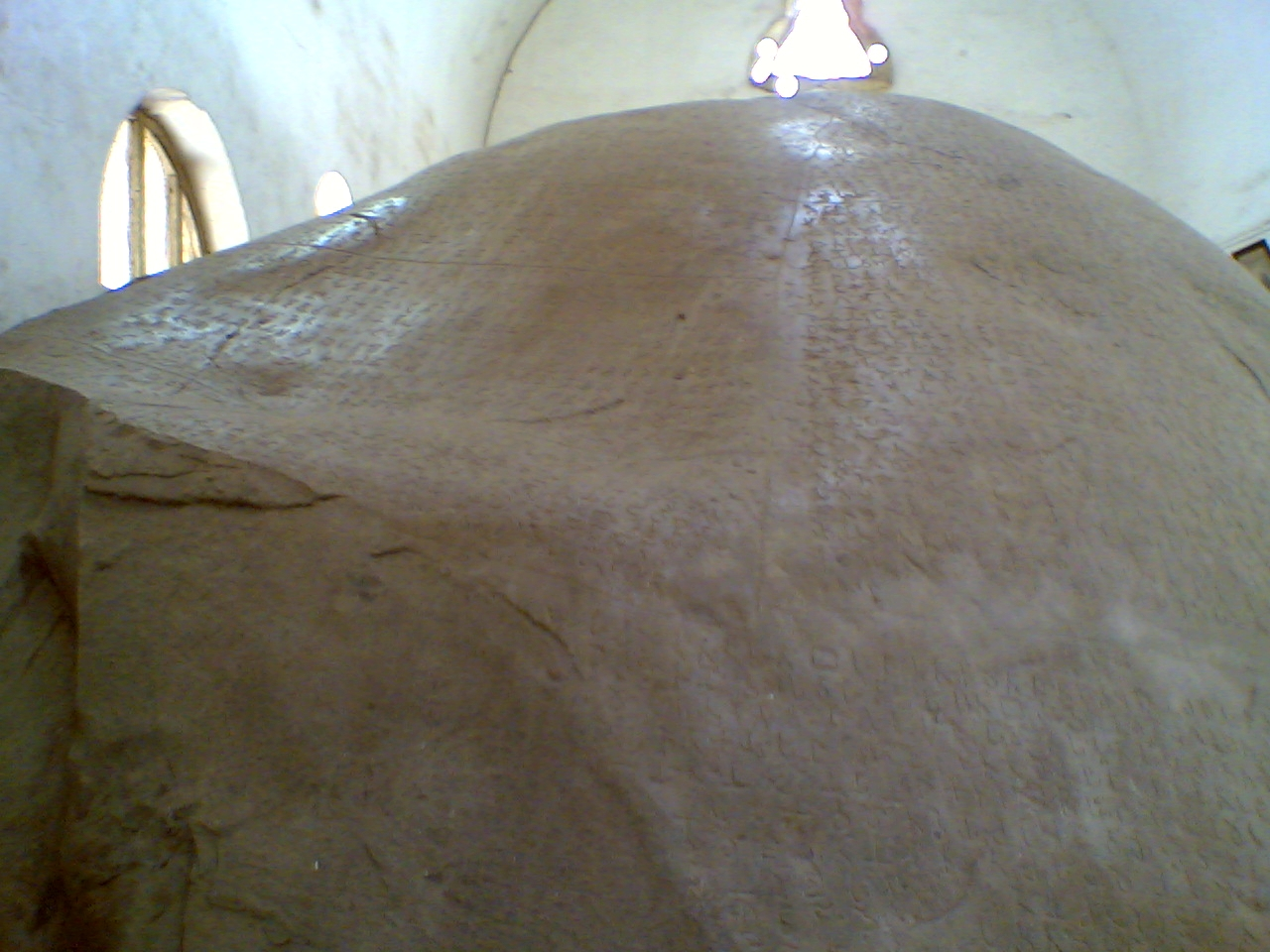
The Junagadh rock contains inscriptions of Ashoka (fourteen of the Edicts of Ashoka), Rudradaman I (the Junagadh rock inscription of Rudradaman) and Skandagupta.

Around 130 CE, Rudradaman I, grandson of Chastana, took the title "Mahakshatrapa" ("Great Satrap"), and defended his kingdom from the Satavahanas. The conflict between Rudradaman and Satavahanas became so gruelling, that in order to contain the conflict, a matrimonial relationship was concluded by giving Rudradaman's daughter to the Satavahana king Vashishtiputra Satakarni. The inscription relating the marriage between Rudradaman's daughter and Vashishtiputra Satakarni appears in a cave at Kanheri:

Of the queen ... of the illustrious Satakarni Vasishthiputra, descended from the race of Karddamaka kings, (and) daughter of the Mahakshatrapa Ru(dra)....... .........of the confidential minister Sateraka, a water-cistern, the meritorious gift.

— Kanheri inscription of Rudradaman I's daughter.

The Satavahanas and the Western Satraps remained at war however, and Rudradaman I defeated the Satavahanas twice in these conflicts, only sparing the life of Vashishtiputra Satakarni due to their family alliance:

Rudradaman (...) who obtained good report because he, in spite of having twice in fair fight completely defeated Satakarni, the lord of Dakshinapatha, on account of the nearness of their connection did not destroy him.

— Junagadh rock inscription of Rudradaman

Rudradaman regained all the previous territories held by Nahapana, probably with the exception of the southern areas of Poona and Nasik (epigraphical remains in these two areas at that time are exclusively Satavahana):

Rudradaman (...) who is the lord of the whole of eastern and western Akaravanti (Akara: East Malwa and Avanti: West Malwa), the Anupa country, Anarta, Surashtra, Svabhra (northern Gujarat), Maru (Marwar), Kachchha (Cutch), Sindhu-Sauvira (Sindh and Multan districts), Kukura (Eastern Rajputana), Aparanta ("Western Border" – Northern Konkan), Nishada (an aboriginal tribe, Malwa and parts of Central India) and other territories gained by his own valour, the towns, marts and rural parts of which are never troubled by robbers, snakes, wild beasts, diseases and the like, where all subjects are attached to him, (and) where through his might the objects of (religion), wealth and pleasure (are duly attained).

— Junagadh rock inscription of Rudradaman. Geographical interpretations in parentheses from Rapson.

===== Victory against the Yaudheyas =====
Later, the Junagadh rock inscription (c. 150 CE) of Rudradaman I acknowledged the military might of the Yaudheyas "who would not submit because they were proud of their title 'heroes among the Kshatriyas'", before explaining that they were ultimately vanquished by Rudradaman I.

Rudradaman (...) who by force destroyed the Yaudheyas who were loath to submit, rendered proud as they were by having manifested their title of 'heroes among all Kshatriyas'.

— Junagadh rock inscription of Rudradaman

Recently discovered pillar inscriptions describe the presence of a Western Satrap named Rupiamma in the Bhandara district of the area of Vidarbha, in the extreme northeastern area of Maharashtra, where he erected the pillars.

Rudradarman is known for his sponsoring of the arts. He is known to have written poetry in the purest of Sanskrit, and made it his court language. His name is forever attached to the inscription by Sudharshini lake.

He had at his court a Greek writer named Yavanesvara ("Lord of the Greeks"), who translated from Greek to Sanskrit the Yavanajataka ("Saying of the Greeks"), an astrological treatise and India's earliest Sanskrit work in horoscopy.

===== Jivadaman (178-181 CE, 197-198 CE) =====
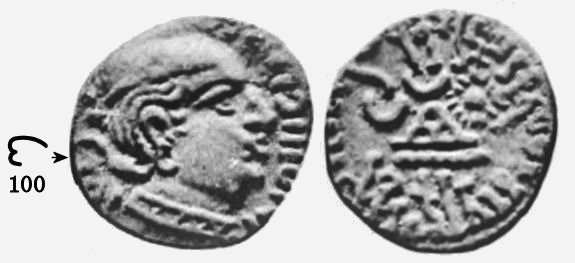
A coin dated to the beginning of the first reign of Jivadaman, in the year 100 of the Saka Era (corresponding to 178 CE).

King Jivadaman became king for the centenary of the Saka Era, in the year 100 (corresponding to 178 CE). His reign is otherwise undocumented, but he is the first Western Satrap ruler who started to print the minting date on his coins, using the Brāhmī numerals of the Brāhmī script behind the king's head. This is of immense value to date precisely Western Satrap rulers, and to clarify perfectly the chronology and succession between them, as they also mention their predecessor on their coins. According to his coins, Jivadaman seems to have ruled two times, once between Saka Era 100 and 103 (178-181 CE), before the rule of Rudrasimha I, and once between Saka Era 119 and 120 (197-198 CE).

===== Rudrasimha I (180-197) =====
[[File:Western Satrap Coin of Rudrasimha I .jpg|thumb|250px|Coin of the Western Kshatrapa ruler Rudrasimha I (178–197). Obv: Bust of Rudrasimha, with corrupted Greek legend "..OHIIOIH.." (Indo-Greek style).

Rev: Three-arched hill or Chaitya, with river, crescent and sun, within Prakrit legend in Brahmi script:

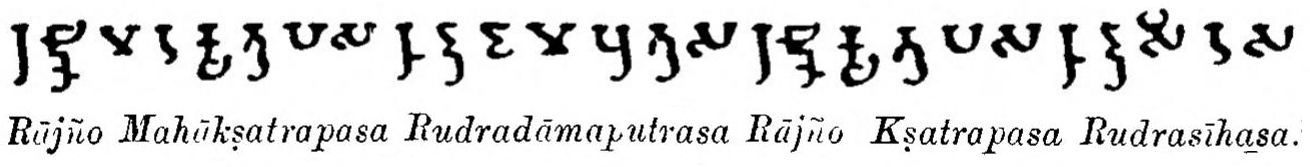
"King and Great Satrap Rudrasimha, son of King and Great Satrap Rudradaman".]]

An inscription of Rudrasimha I (178–197) was recently found at Setkhedi in Shajapur district, dated to 107 Saka Era, that is 185 CE, confirming the expansion of the Western Satraps to the east at that date. There is also an earlier inscription related to Saka rule in Ujjain, as well as a later one, the Kanakerha inscription, related to Saka rule in the area of Vidisha, Sanchi and Eran in the early 4th century.

===== Great Satrap Rupiamma (2nd century CE) =====
A memorial pillar with an inscription in the name of "Mahakshatrapa Kumara Rupiamma" has been recovered in Pauni in the central region of Vidharba, and is dated to the 2nd century CE. Although this Great Satrap is not otherwise known from coinage, this memorial pillar is thought to mark the southern extent of the conquests of the Western Satraps, much beyond the traditionally held boundary of the Narmada River. The use of the word "Kumara" may also mean that Rupiamma was the son of a Great Satrap, rather than holding the title himself.

==== Loss of southern territories to the Satavahanas (end of 2nd century CE) ====
The south Indian ruler Yajna Sri Satakarni (170-199 CE) of the Satavahana dynasty defeated the Western Satraps in the late 2nd century CE, thereby reconquering their southern regions in western and central India, which led to the decline of the Western Satraps.

Yajna Sri Satakarni left inscriptions in Nasik Caves, Kanheri and Guntur, testifying to the renewed extent of Satavahana territory. There are two inscriptions of Yajna Sri Satakarni at Kanheri, in cave No. 81, and in the Chaitya cave No. 3. In the Nasik Caves, there is one inscription of Sri Yajna Satakarni, in the 7th year of his reign.

There is a possibility, however, that the areas of Poona and Nasik had remained in the hands of the Satavahanas since the time of Gautamiputra Satakarni after his victory over Nahapana, as there are no epigraphical records of the Kardamakas in this area.

==== Rudrasena II (256–278) ====
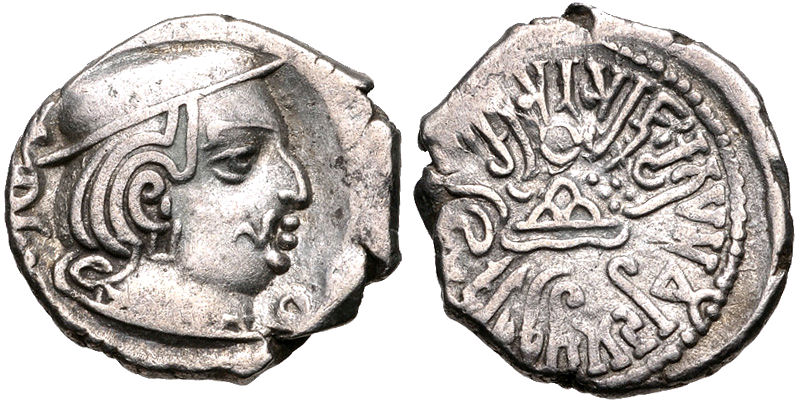
Rudrasena II (256-278 CE). Head right, wearing close-fitting cap / Three-arched hill; group of five pellets to right.

Western Satrap territory extended from the west coast of India to Vidisha/ Sanchi and Eran, from the time of Rudrasena II (256–278) well into the 4th century. Marital alliances with the Ikshvaku of southern India are mentioned in inscriptions at Nagarjunakonda (3rd century CE).

The Kshatrapa dynasty seems to have reached a high level of prosperity under the rule of Rudrasena II (256–278), 19th ruler of Kshatrapa.

A marital alliance between the Andhra Ikshvaku and the Western Satraps seems to have occurred during the time of Rudrasena II, as the Andhra Ikshvaku ruler Māṭharīputra Vīrapuruṣadatta (250-275 CE) seems to have had as one of his wives Rudradhara-bhattarika, the daughter of "the ruler of Ujjain", possibly king Rudrasena II. According to an inscription at Nagarjunakonda, Iksvaku king Virapurushadatta had multiple wives, including Rudradhara-bhattarika, the daughter of the ruler of Ujjain (Uj(e)nika mahara(ja) balika).

The region of Sanchi-Vidisha was again captured from the Satavahanas during the rule of Rudrasena II (255-278 CE), as shown by finds of Rudrasena II's coinage in the area. The region would then remain under Western Satrap rule until the 4th century CE, as attested by the Kanakerha inscription.

The last Kshatrapa ruler of the Chastana family was Visvasena (Vishwasen, r.293–304 CE), brother and successor to Bhartrdaman and son of Rudrasena II. A coin of Visvasena was found in excavations at the Ajanta Caves, in the burnt-brick monastery facing the caves on the right bank of the river Waghora.

=== Rudrasimha II dynasty (c. 304–396 CE) ===
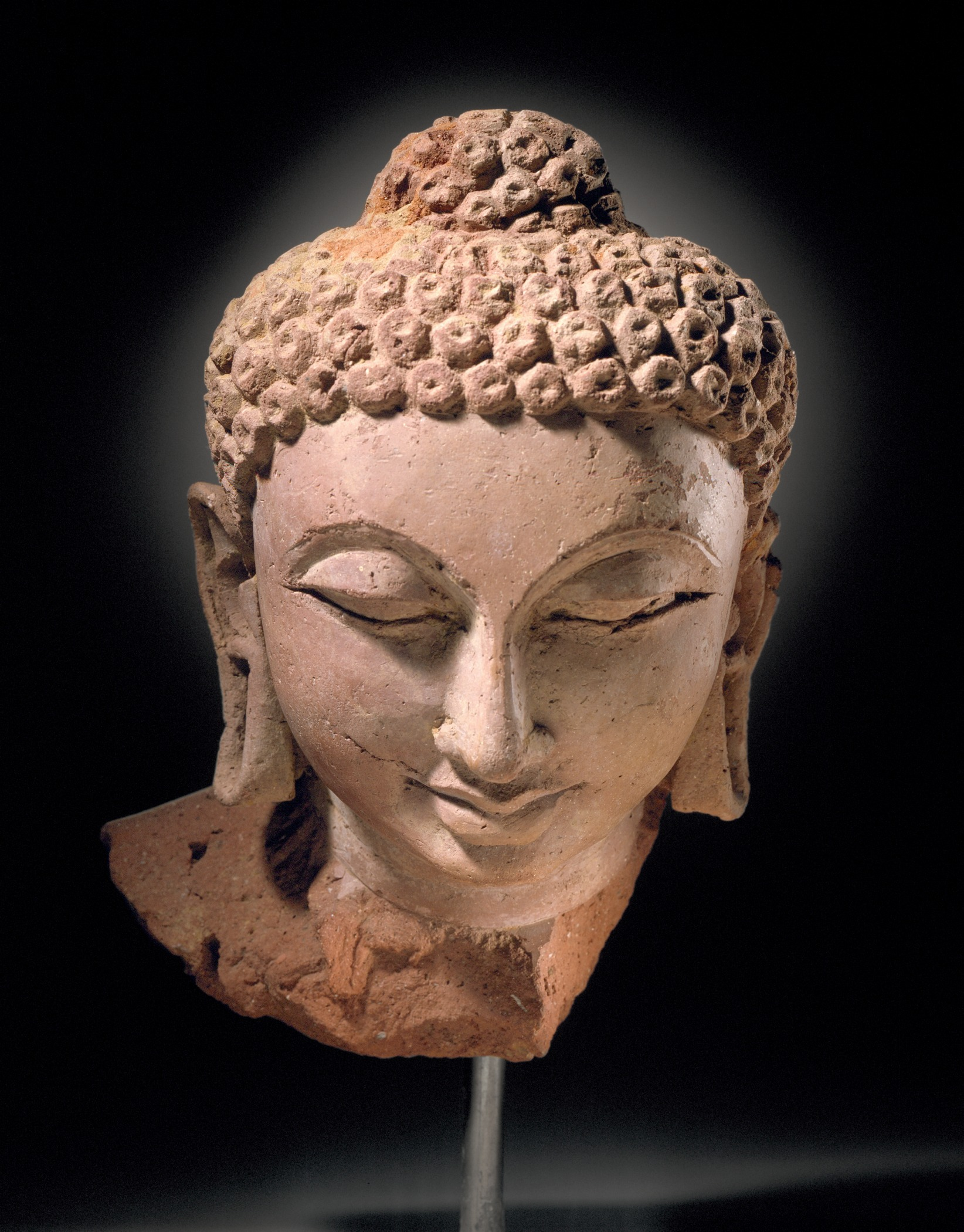
Head of Buddha Shakyamuni, Devnimori, Gujarat (375–400). Derived from the Greco-Buddhist art of Gandhara, an example of the Western Indian art of the Western Satraps.

A new family took over, started by the rule of Rudrasimha II (r. 304–348 CE). He declared on his coins to be the son of a Lord (Svami) Jivadaman. His rule is partly coeval with that of other rulers, who were his sons as written on their coins and may have been sub-kings: Yasodaman II (r. 317–332 CE) and Rudradaman II (r. 332–348 CE).

Contributions to Buddhism

Under Rudrasimha II, the Western Satraps are known to have maintained their presence in the Central Indian areas of Vidisha/Sanchi/Eran well into the 4th century: during his rule, in 319 CE, a Saka ruler inscribed the Kanakerha inscription, on the hill of Sanchi mentioning the construction of a well by the Saka chief and "righteous conqueror" (dharmaviyagi mahadandanayaka) Sridharavarman (339-368 CE). Another inscription of the same Sridhavarman with his military commander is known from Eran. These inscriptions point to the extent of Saka rule as of the time of Rudrasimha II.

The construction of Buddhist monuments in the area of Gujarat during the later part of Western Satrap rule is attested with the site of Devnimori, which incorporates viharas and a stupa. Coins of Rudrasimha were found inside the Buddhist stupa of Devnimori. The Buddha images in Devnimori clearly show the influence of the Greco-Buddhist art of Gandhara, and have been described as examples of the Western Indian art of the Western Satraps. It has been suggested that the art of Devnimori represented a Western Indian artistic tradition that was anterior to the rise of Gupta Empire art, and that it may have influenced not only the latter, but also the art of the Ajanta Caves, Sarnath and other places from the 5th century onward.

Overall, the Western Satraps may have played a role in the transmission of the art of Gandhara to the western Deccan region.

==== Sasanian expansion in the northwest ====
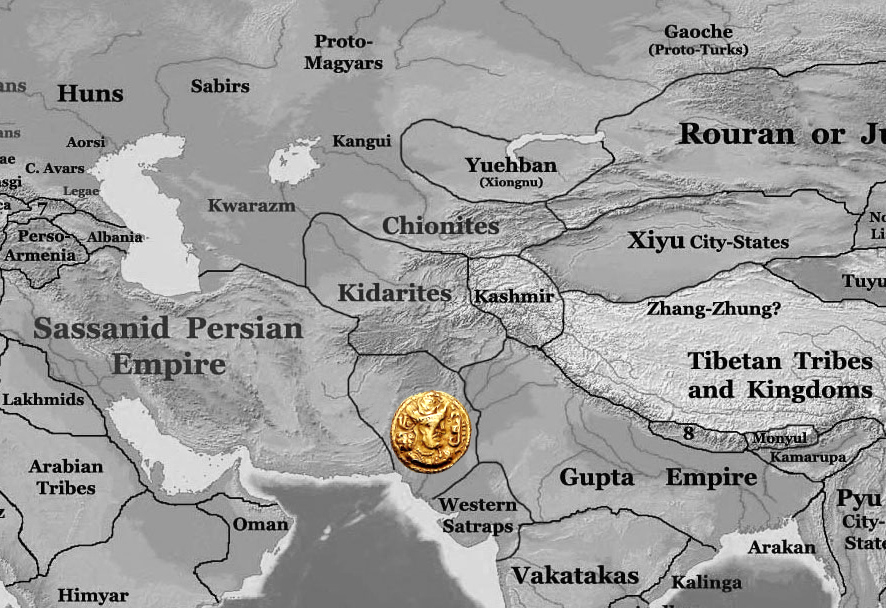
Location of the Sasanian coinage of Sindh, circa 400 CE, in relation with the other polities of the time.

After a period of control of the areas as far as Gandhara by the Kushano-Sasanians, the Sasanian Empire further expanded into the northwest of the subcontinent, particularly in the regions of Gandhara and Punjab, from the time of Shapur II circa 350 CE. Further south, as far as the mouth of the Indus river, the Sasanians exerted some sort of control or influence, as suggested by the Sasanian coinage of Sindh. It is probable that the Sasanian expansion in India, which put an end to the remnants of Kushan rule, was also made in part at the expense of the Western Satraps.

==== Conquered by the Guptas (c. 335–415 CE) ====
===== Central India conquered by Samudragupta (r. 336–380 CE) =====
The Central Indian region around Vidisha/ Sanchi and Eran had been occupied by a Saka ruler named Sridharavarman, who his known from the Kanakerha inscription at Sanchi, and another inscription with his Naga general at Eran. At Eran, it seems that Sridharavarman's inscription is succeeded by a monument and an inscription by Gupta Empire Samudragupta (r.336-380 CE), established "for the sake of augmenting his fame", who may therefore have ousted Sridharavarman's Sakas in his campaigns to the West. Sridharavarman is probably the "Saka" ruler mentioned in the Allahabad pillar inscription of Samudragupta, as having "paid homage" to the Gupta Emperor, forced to "self-surrender, offering (their own) daughters in marriage and a request for the administration of their own districts and provinces".

===== Gujarat campaign of Ramagupta =====
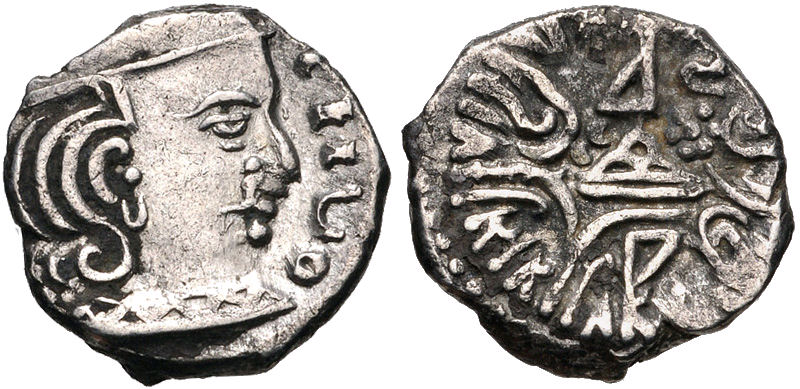
Coin of the last Western Satrap ruler Rudrasimha III (388–395).

Rudrasimha III seems to have been the last of the Western Satrap rulers. A fragment from the Natya-darpana mentions that the Gupta king Ramagupta, the elder brother of Chandragupta II, decided to expand his kingdom by attacking the Western Satraps in Gujarat.

The campaign soon took a turn for the worse and the Gupta army was trapped. The Saka king, Rudrasimha III, demanded that Ramagupta hand over his wife Dhruvadevi in exchange for peace. To avoid the ignominy, the Guptas decided to send Madhavasena, a courtesan and a beloved of Chandragupta, disguised as the queen. However, Chandragupta changed the plan and himself went to the Saka King disguised as the queen. He then killed Rudrasimha and later his own brother, Ramagupta. Dhruvadevi was then married to Chandragupta.

===== Conquests of Chandragupta II (r. 380–415 CE) =====
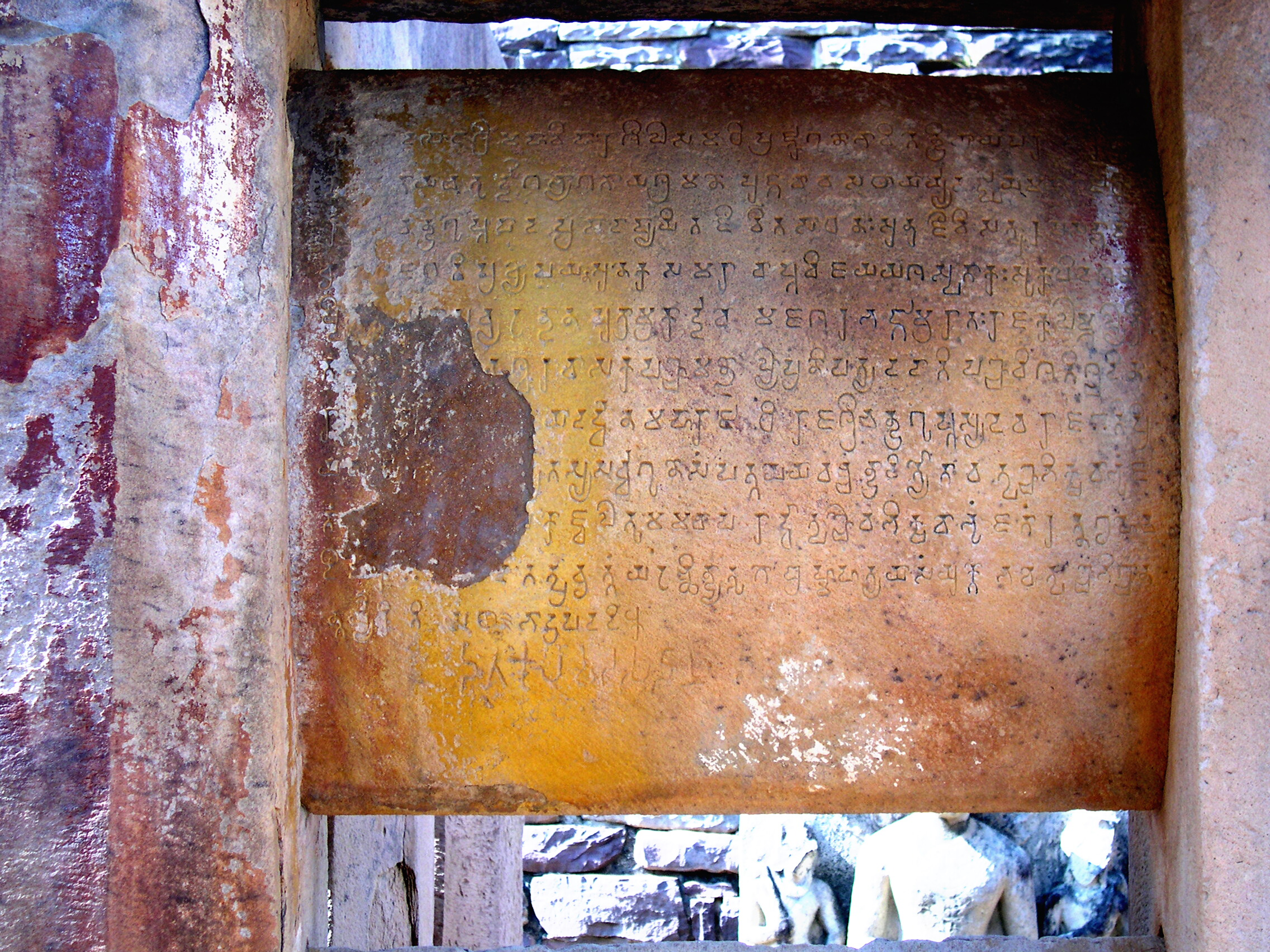
The victorious Sanchi inscription of Chandragupta II (412-413 CE).

The Western Satraps were eventually conquered by emperor Chandragupta II. Inscriptions of a victorious Chandragupta II in the year 412-413 CE can be found on the railing near the Eastern Gateway of the Great Stupa in Sanchi.

The glorious Candragupta (II), (...) who proclaims in the world the good behaviour of the excellent people, namely, the dependents (of the king), and who has acquired banners of victory and fame in many battles

— Sanchi inscription of Chandragupta II, 412-413 CE.

The Gupta ruler Skandagupta (455-467 CE) is known for a long inscription where he describes himself as "the ruler of the earth" on a large rock at Junagadh, in Gujarat, next to the older inscriptions of Ashoka and Rudradaman I, confirming the Gupta hold on the western regions.

Following these conquests, the silver coins of the Gupta kings Chandragupta II and his son Kumaragupta I adopted the Western Satrap design (itself derived from the Indo-Greeks) with bust of the ruler and pseudo-Greek inscription on the obverse, and a royal eagle (Garuda, the dynastic symbol of the Guptas) replacing the chaitya hill with star and crescent on the reverse.

Gupta Empire coins on the model of the Western Satraps

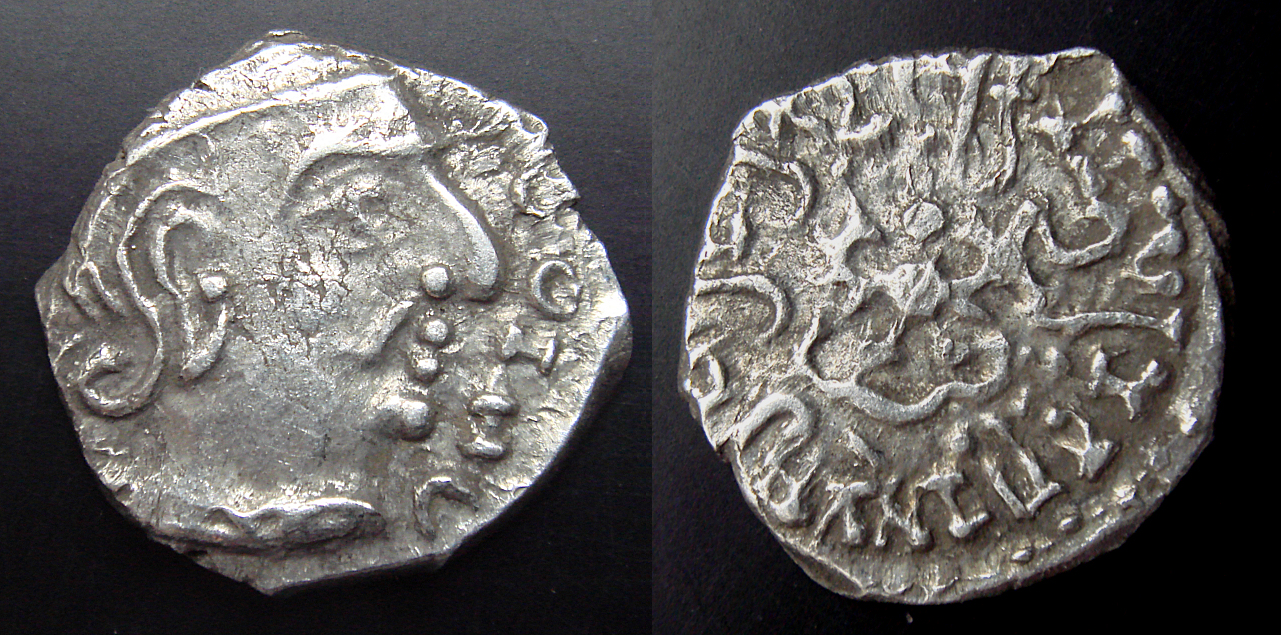
Coin of Gupta ruler Chandragupta II (r.380–415) in the style of the Western Satraps.

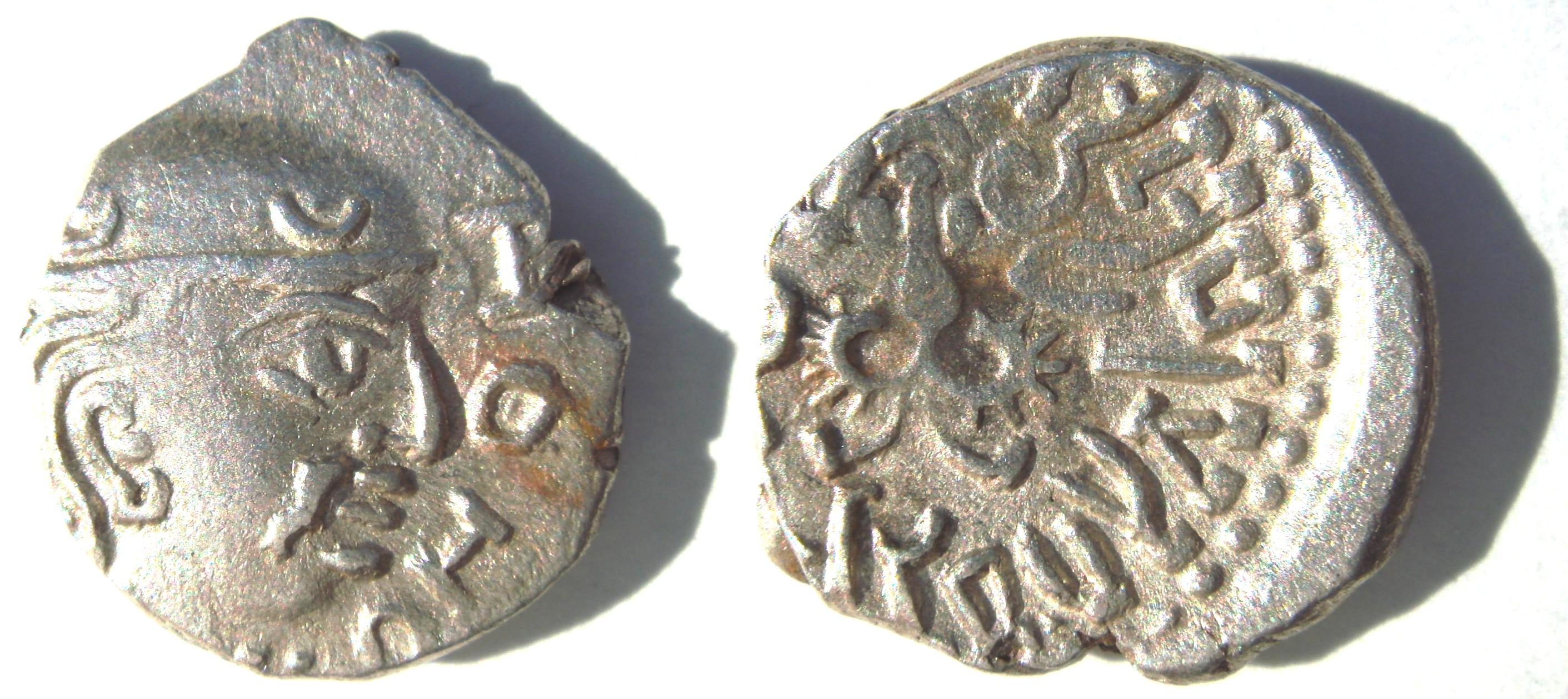
Coin of Gupta ruler Kumaragupta I (r.414–455) (Western territories).

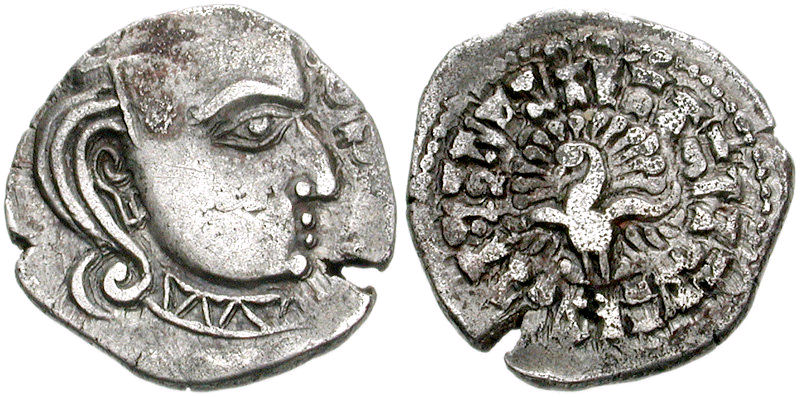
Coin of Gupta ruler Skandagupta (r.455-467), in the style of the Western Satraps.

The campaigns of Chandragupta II brought an end to nearly four centuries of Saka rule on the subcontinent. This period also corresponds to the wane of the very last Kushan rulers in the Punjab and the arrival of the Kidarite Huns, the first Huna invaders from the steppes of Central Asia. Less than a century later, the Alchon Huns in turn invaded northern India, bringing an end to the Gupta Empire and the Classical period of India.

== Coinage ==
The Kshatrapas have a very rich and interesting coinage. It was based on the coinage of the earlier Indo-Greek Kings, with Greek or pseudo-Greek legend and stylised profiles of royal busts on the obverse. The reverse of the coins, however, is original and typically depict a thunderbolt and an arrow, and later, a chaitya or three-arched hill and river symbol with a crescent and the sun, within a legend in Brahmi. These coins are very informative, since they record the name of the King, of his father, and the date of issue, and have helped clarify the early history of India.

=== Regnal dates ===
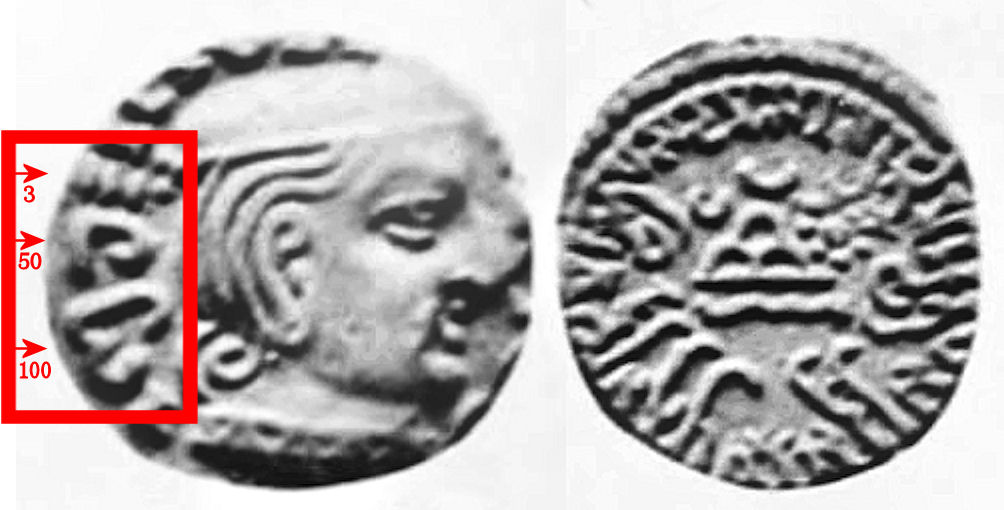
Coin of Damasena. The minting date, here 153 (100-50-3 in Brahmi script numerals) of the Saka era, therefore 232 CE, clearly appears behind the head of the king.

From the reigns of Jivadaman and Rudrasimha I, the date of minting of each coin, reckoned in the Saka era, is usually written on the obverse behind the king's head in Brahmi numerals, allowing for a quite precise datation of the rule of each king. This is a rather uncommon case in Indian numismatics. Some, such as the numismat R.C Senior considered that these dates might correspond to the much earlier Azes era instead.

Also the father of each king is systematically mentioned in the reverse legends, which allows reconstruction of the regnal succession.

=== Languages ===
Kharoshthi, a script in use in more northern territories (area of Gandhara), is employed together with the Brahmi script and the Greek script on the first coins of the Western Satraps, but is finally abandoned from the time of Chastana. From that time, only the Brahmi script would remain, together with the pseudo-Greek script on the facing, to write the Prakrit language employed by the Western satraps. Occasionally, the legends are in Sanskrit instead.

The coins of Nahapana bear the Greek script legend "PANNIΩ IAHAPATAC NAHAΠANAC", transliteration of the Prakrit "Raño Kshaharatasa Nahapanasa": "In the reign of Kshaharata Nahapana". The coins of Castana also have a readable legend "PANNIΩ IATPAΠAC CIASTANCA", transliteration of the Prakrit "Raño Kshatrapasa Castana": "In the reign of the Satrap Castana". After these two rulers, the legend in Greek script becomes denaturated, and seems to lose all signification, only retaining an aesthetic value. By the 4th century, the coins of Rudrasimha II exhibit the following type of meaningless legend in corrupted Greek script: "...ΛIOΛVICIVIIIΛ...".

=== Influences ===
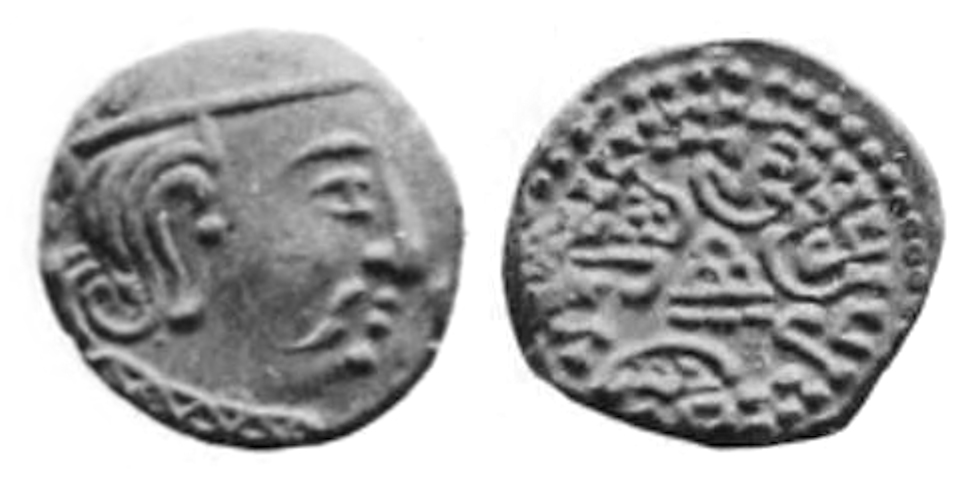
An imitation of Western Satrap coinage: silver coin of king Dahrasena (c. 415–455 CE), of the Traikutaka dynasty.

The coins of the Kshatrapas were also very influential and imitated by neighbouring or later dynasties, such as the Satavahanas, and the Guptas. Silver coins of the Gupta kings Chandragupta II and his son Kumaragupta I adopted the Western Satrap design (itself derived from the Indo-Greeks) with bust of the ruler and pseudo-Greek inscription on the obverse, and a royal eagle (Garuda, the dynastic symbol of the Guptas) replacing the chaitya hill with star and crescent on the reverse.

The Western Satrap coin design was also adopted by the subsequent dynasty of the Traikutakas (388–456) or the Kingdom of Valabhi (475–776).

== Monuments ==
Sudarshan Lake of the Satrap period is mentioned in major rock edicts of Junagadh but no trace of it remains. Six inscription-stones called Lashtis of 1st century were recovered from a hillock near Andhau village in the Khavda region of Kutch and were moved to the Kutch Museum in Bhuj. They are the earliest dated monuments of the Satrap period and were erected in the time of Rudradaman I.

The large number of stone inscriptions from Kutch and Saurastra as well as hundreds of coins throughout Gujarat are found belonging to the Satrap period. The earlier caves at Sana, Junagadh, Dhank, Talaja, Sidhasar, Prabhas Patan and Ranapar in the Barada Hills are mostly plain and austere in looks except some carvings in the Bava Pyara Caves of Junagadh. They are comparable to Andhra-Satrap period caves in Deccan. As they have almost no carvings, the determination of their date and chronology is difficult. The Uparkot Caves of Junagadh and the Khambhalida Caves belong to the later years of the Satraps. The stupas excavated at Boria and Intwa near Junagadh belonged to the Satrap period. The stupa excavated at Shamlaji probably belonged to this period or to the Gupta period.

== Contribution to Sanskrit epigraphy ==
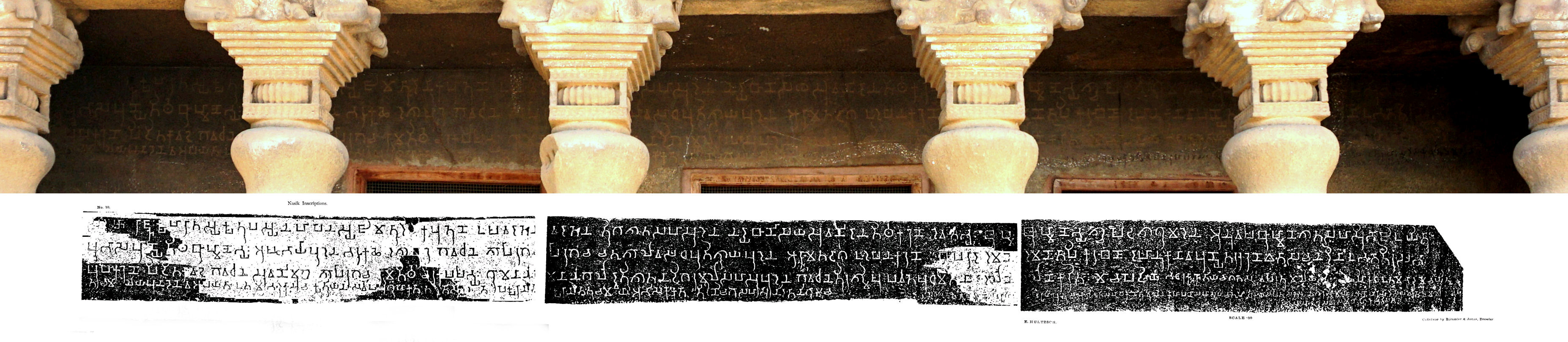
The inscription of Ushavadata, son-in-law of Nahapana, runs the length of the entrance wall of one of the Nasik caves, over the doors, and is here visible in parts between the pillars. Actual image, and corresponding rubbing. Cave No.10, Nasik Caves.

In what has been described as "the great linguistical paradox of India", Sanskrit inscriptions first appeared much later than Prakrit inscriptions, although Prakrit is considered as a descendant of the Sanskrit language. This is because Prakrit, in its multiple variants, had been favoured since the time of the influential Edicts of Ashoka (circa 250 BCE).

Besides a few examples from the 1st century BCE, most of the early Sanskrit inscriptions date to the time of the Indo-Scythian rulers, either the Northern Satraps around Mathura for the earliest ones, or, slightly later, the closely related Western Satraps in western and central India. It is thought that they became promoters of Sanskrit as a way to show their attachment to Indian culture: according to Salomon "their motivation in promoting Sanskrit was presumably a desire to establish themselves as legitimate Indian or at least Indianized rulers and to curry the favor of the educated Brahmanical elite".

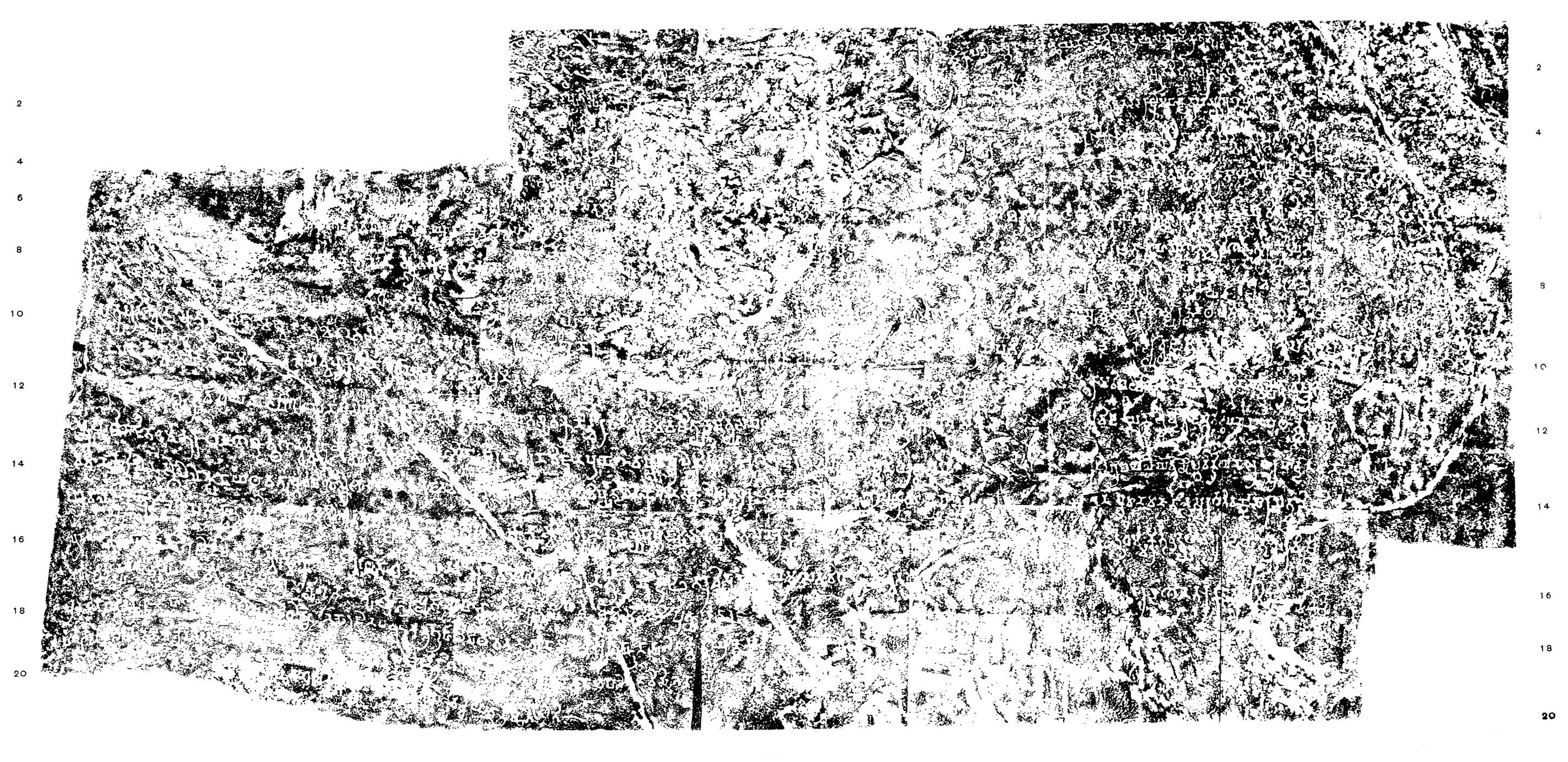
The Junagadh rock inscription, inscribed by Rudradaman I circa 150 CE, is "the first long inscription recorded entirely in more or less standard Sanskrit".

In western India, the first known inscription in Sanskrit appears to have been made by Ushavadata, son-in-law of the Western Satrap ruler Nahapana, at the front of Cave no.10 in the Nasik Caves. The inscription dates to the early 2nd century CE, and has hybrid features.

Scythian warriors
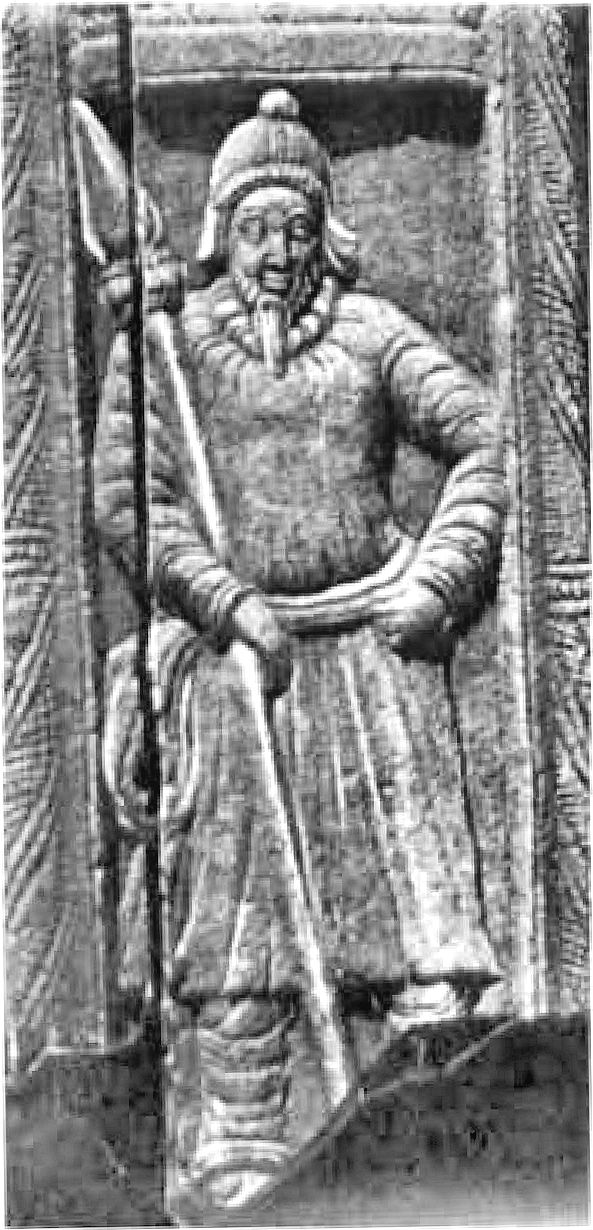
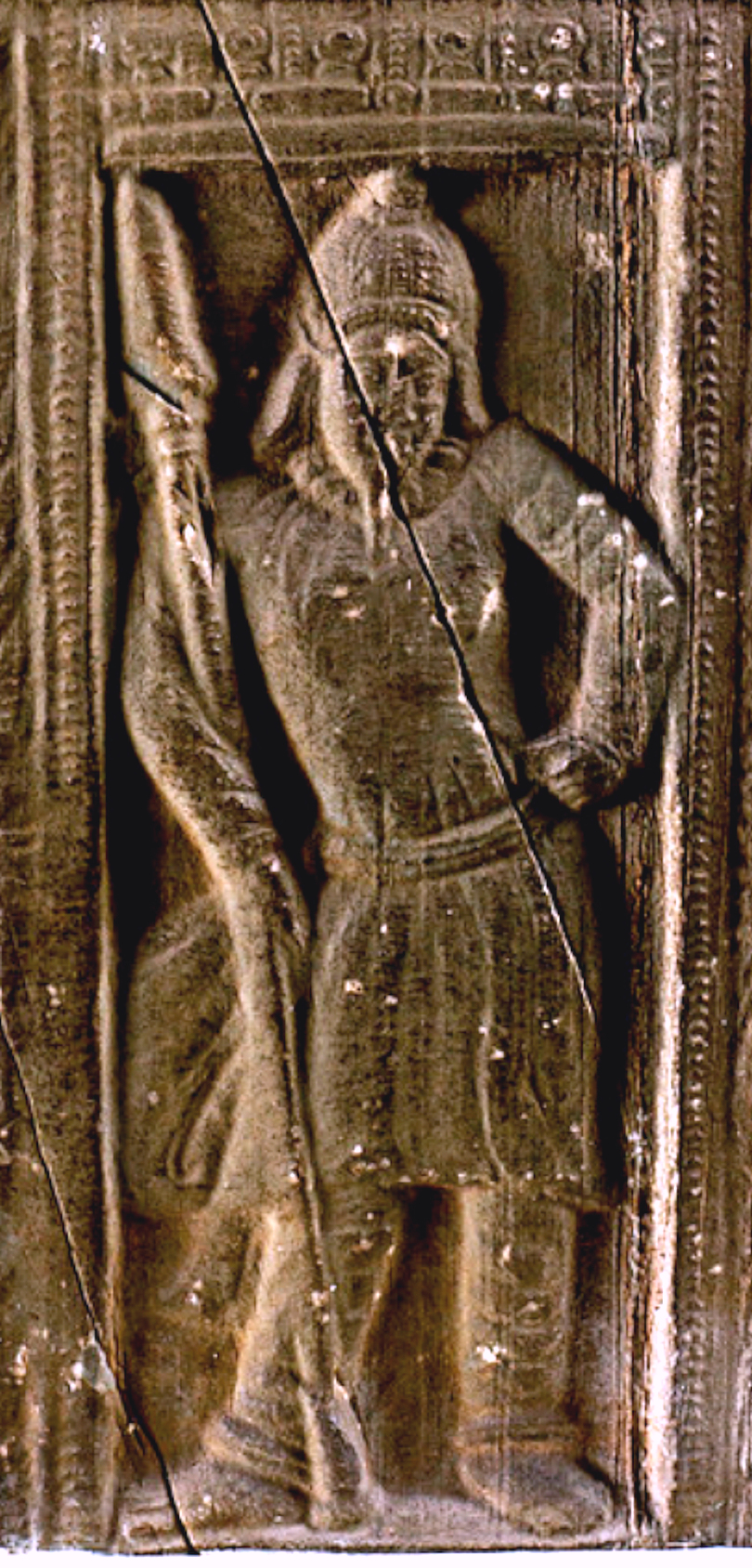
"Scythian" soldier, Nagarjunakonda Palace site, circa 2nd century CE.

The Junagadh rock inscription of Western Satraps ruler Rudradaman I (c. 150 AD, Gujarat) is the first long inscription in fairly standard Sanskrit that has survived into the modern era. It represents a turning point in Sanskrit epigraphy, states Salomon, being "the first extensive record in the poetic style" in "more or less standard Sanskrit". The Rudradaman inscription is "not pure classical Sanskrit", but with few epic-vernacular Sanskrit exceptions, it approaches high classical Sanskrit. It is important because it is likely the prototype of the extensive Sanskrit inscriptions of the Gupta Empire era. These inscriptions are also in the Brāhmī script. During the reign of Rudradaman, circa 150 CE, it is also known that the Greek writer Yavanesvara translated the Yavanajataka from Greek to Sanskrit, for "the use of those who could not speak Greek", a translation which became an authority for all later astrology works in India.

The spread of the usage of Sanskrit inscriptions to the south can also probably be attributed to the influence of the Western Satraps, who were in close relation with southern Indian rulers: according to Salomon "a Nagarjunakonda memorial pillar inscription of the time of King Rudrapurusadatta attests to a marital alliance between the Western Ksatrapas and the Iksvaku rulers of Nagarjunakonda". The Nagarjunakonda inscriptions are the earliest substantial South Indian Sanskrit inscriptions, probably from the late 3rd-century to early 4th-century CE. These inscriptions are related to Buddhism and to the Shaivism tradition of Hinduism, and parts of them reflect both standard Sanskrit and hybridised Sanskrit. An earlier hybrid Sanskrit inscription found on Amaravati slab is dated to the late 2nd-century, while a few later ones include Sanskrit inscriptions along with Prakrit inscriptions related to Hinduism and Buddhism. After the 3rd-century CE, Sanskrit inscriptions dominate and many have survived.

== Possible vassalage to the Kushans ==
Statue of Chastana
Mathura Museum
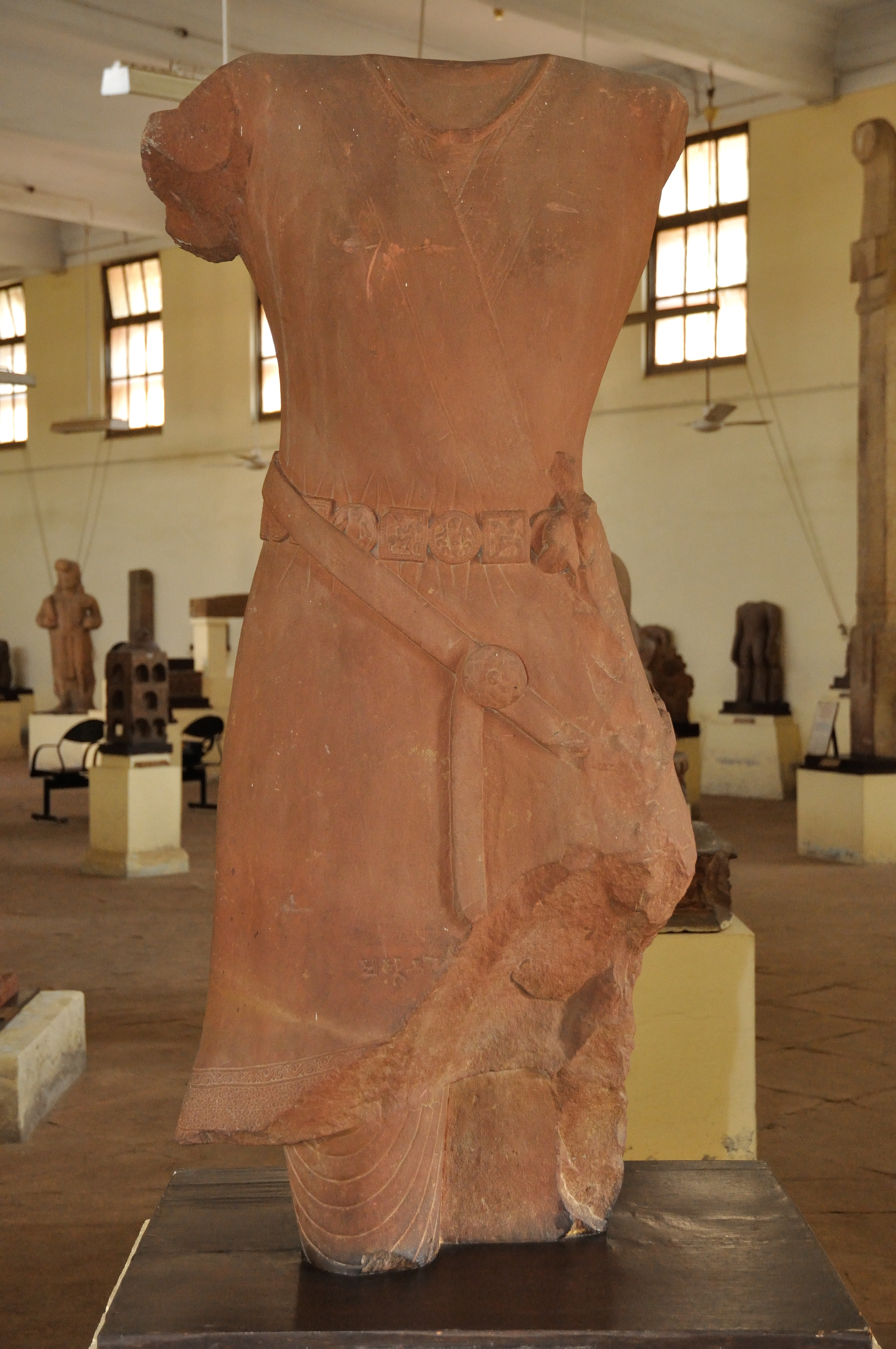
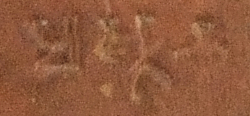
Inscribed statue of Saka King Chastana, with inscription "Shastana" (Middle Brahmi script: Sha-sta-na). Kushan period.

It is still unclear whether the Western Satraps were independent rulers or vassals of the Kushan Empire (30–375 CE). The continued use of the word "Satrap" on their coin would suggest a recognised subjection to a higher ruler, possibly the Kushan emperor.

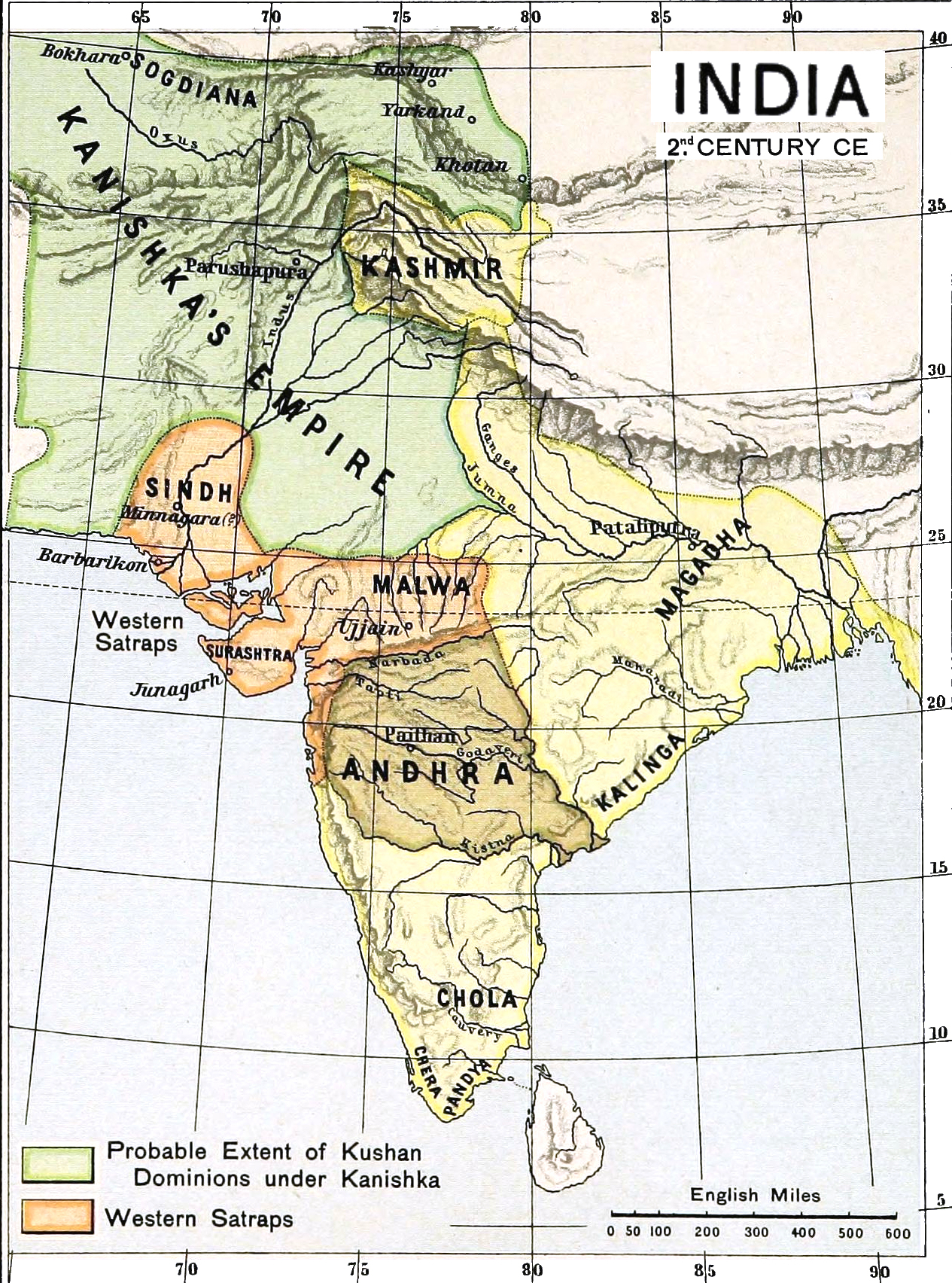
The Western Satraps (orange) and the Kushan Empire (green), in the 2nd century CE

Also, a statue of Chastana was found in Mathura at the Temple of Mat together with the famous statues of Vima Kadphises and Kanishka. The statue has the inscription "Shastana" (Middle Brahmi script: Sha-sta-na). This also would suggest at least alliance and friendship, if not vassalage. Finally Kanishka claims in the Rabatak inscription that his power extends to Ujjain, the classical capital of the Western Satrap realm. This combined with the presence of the Chastana statue side by side with Kanishka would also suggest Kushan alliance with the Western Satraps.

Finally, following the period of the "Northern Satraps" who ruled in the area of Mathura, the "Great Satrap" Kharapallana and the "Satrap" Vanaspara are known from an inscription in Sarnath to have been feudatories of the Kushans.

Generally, the position taken by modern scholarship is that the Western Satraps were vassals of the Kushans, at least in the early period until Rudradaman I conquered the Yaudheyas, who are usually thought to be Kushan vassals. The question is not considered perfectly settled.

== List of rulers ==
Family tree

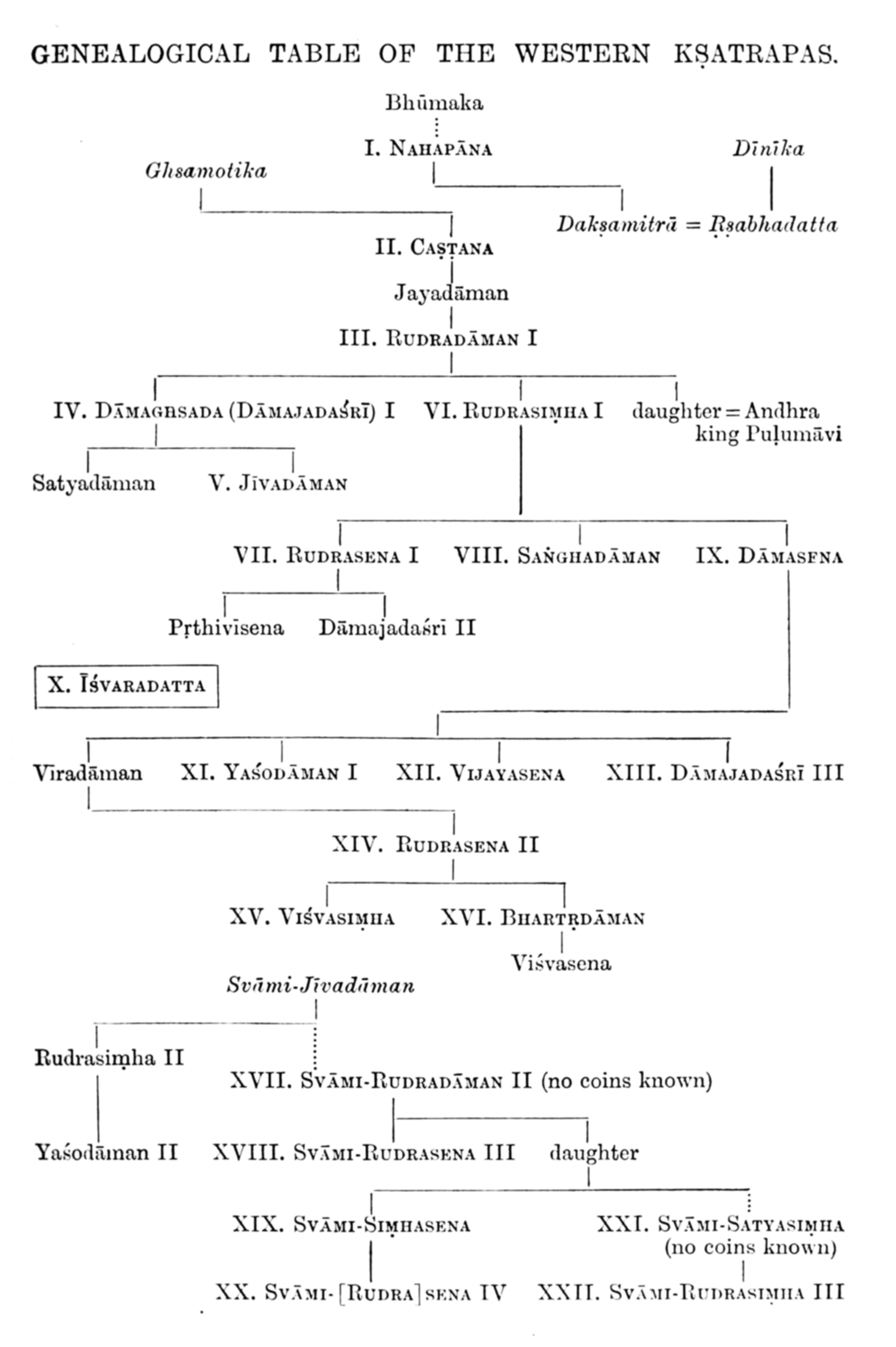
Genealogical table of the Western Satraps

== See also ==
- History of India
- Indo-Greek Kingdom
- Indo-Scythians
- Indo-Parthians
- Kushan Empire
- Rulers of Malwa
- Abhiras

== Sources ==
- Salomon, Richard (1998). Indian Epigraphy: A Guide to the Study of Inscriptions in Sanskrit, Prakrit, and the Other Indo-Aryan Languages. Oxford: Oxford University Press. ISBN 978-0-19-509984-3.
- K. Krishna Murthy (1977). Nāgārjunakoṇḍā: A Cultural Study. Concept. OCLC 4541213.

| Timeline and cultural period | Indus plain (Punjab-Sapta Sindhu-Gujarat) | Gangetic Plain | | | Central India | Southern India |
| Timeline and cultural period | Indus plain (Punjab-Sapta Sindhu-Gujarat) | Upper Gangetic Plain (Ganga-Yamuna doab) | Middle Gangetic Plain | Lower Gangetic Plain | Central India | Southern India |
IRON AGE
| Culture | Late Vedic Period | Late Vedic Period; Painted Grey Ware culture | Late Vedic Period; Northern Black Polished Ware | | Pre-history | |
| 6th century BCE | Gandhara | Kuru-Panchala | Magadha | | Adivasi (tribes) | Assaka |
| Culture | Persian-Greek influences | "Second Urbanisation"; Rise of Shramana movements Jainism - Buddhism - Ājīvika - Yoga | | | Pre-history | |
| 5th century BCE | (Persian conquests) | | Shaishunaga dynasty | | Adivasi (tribes) | Assaka |
| 4th century BCE | (Greek conquests) | Nanda empire | | | | |
HISTORICAL AGE
| Culture | Spread of Buddhism | | | | Pre-history | |
| 3rd century BCE | Maurya Empire | | | | | Satavahana dynasty Sangam period (300 BCE – 200 CE); Early Cholas; Early Pandyan kingdom Cheras |
| Culture | Preclassical Hinduism (Note: Michaels (2004) p.39) - "Hindu Synthesis" (Note: Hiltebeitel (2002)) (ca. 200 BCE - 300 CE) (Note: Michaels (2004) p.39) (Note: Hiltebeitel (2002)); Epics - Puranas - Ramayana - Mahabharata - Bhagavad Gita - Brahma Sutras - Smarta Tradition; Mahayana Buddhism | | | | | |
| 2nd century BCE | Indo-Greek Kingdom | | Shunga Empire; Maha-Meghavahana Dynasty | | | Satavahana dynasty Sangam period (300 BCE – 200 CE); Early Cholas; Early Pandyan kingdom Cheras |
| 1st century BCE | Indo-Greek Kingdom | | Shunga Empire; Maha-Meghavahana Dynasty | | | Satavahana dynasty Sangam period (300 BCE – 200 CE); Early Cholas; Early Pandyan kingdom Cheras |
| 1st century CE | Indo-Scythians; Indo-Parthians | | Kuninda Kingdom | | | Satavahana dynasty Sangam period (300 BCE – 200 CE); Early Cholas; Early Pandyan kingdom Cheras |
| 2nd century | Kushan Empire | | | | | Satavahana dynasty Sangam period (300 BCE – 200 CE); Early Cholas; Early Pandyan kingdom Cheras |
| 3rd century | Kushano-Sasanian Kingdom; Western Satraps | Kushan Empire | | Kamarupa kingdom | Adivasi (tribes) | Satavahana dynasty Sangam period (300 BCE – 200 CE); Early Cholas; Early Pandyan kingdom Cheras |
| Culture | "Golden Age of Hinduism"(ca. CE 320-650) (Note: Michaels (2004) p.40); Puranas - Kural; Co-existence of Hinduism and Buddhism | | | | | |
| 4th century | Kidarites | Gupta Empire; Varman dynasty | | | | Andhra Ikshvakus; Kalabhra dynasty Kadamba Dynasty; Western Ganga Dynasty |
| 5th century | Hephthalite Empire | Alchon Huns | | | | Vishnukundina; Kalabhra dynasty |
| 6th century | Nezak Huns; Kabul Shahi; Maitraka | | | | Adivasi (tribes) | Vishnukundina; Badami Chalukyas; Kalabhra dynasty |
| Culture | Late-Classical Hinduism (ca. CE 650-1100) (Note: Michaels (2004) p.41); Advaita Vedanta - Tantra; Decline of Buddhism in India | | | | | |
| 7th century | Indo-Sassanids | | Vakataka dynasty Empire of Harsha | Mlechchha dynasty | Adivasi (tribes) | Badami Chalukyas; Eastern Chalukyas; Pandyan kingdom (revival); Pallava |
| 7th century | Karkota dynasty | | | | Adivasi (tribes) | |
| 8th century | Kabul Shahi | Pala Empire | | | Adivasi (tribes) | Eastern Chalukyas; Pandyan kingdom Kalachuri |
| 9th century | Gurjara-Pratihara | | | | Adivasi (tribes) | Rashtrakuta Empire; Eastern Chalukyas; Pandyan kingdom Medieval Cholas; Chera Perumals of Makkotai |
| 10th century | Ghaznavids | | | Pala dynasty Kamboja-Pala dynasty | Adivasi (tribes) | Kalyani Chalukyas; Eastern Chalukyas; Medieval Cholas; Chera Perumals of Makkotai; Rashtrakuta |
References and sources for table References Sources: Flood, Gavin D. (1996), An Introduction to Hinduism, Cambridge University Press; Hiltebeitel, Alf (2002), Hinduism. In: Joseph Kitagawa, "The Religious Traditions of Asia: Religion, History, and Culture", Routledge; Michaels, Axel (2004), Hinduism. Past and present, Princeton, New Jersey: Princeton University Press

| Territories/ dates | Western India | Western Pakistan Balochistan | Paropamisadae Arachosia | Bajaur | Gandhara | Western Punjab | Eastern Punjab | Mathura |
|---|---|---|---|---|---|---|---|---|
| | | | INDO-GREEK KINGDOM | | | | | |
| 90–85 BCE | | | Nicias | Menander II | | Artemidoros | | |
| 90–70 BCE | | | Hermaeus | Archebius | | | | |
| 85-60 BCE | | | INDO-SCYTHIAN KINGDOM; Maues | | | | | |
| 75–70 BCE | | | Vonones; Spalahores | Telephos | | Apollodotus II | | |
| 65–55 BCE | | | Spalirises; Spalagadames | | | Hippostratos | Dionysios | |
| 55–35 BCE | | | Azes I | | | | Zoilos II | |
| 55–35 BCE | | | Azilises; Azes II | | | | Apollophanes | Indo-Scythian dynasty of the NORTHERN SATRAPS; Hagamasha |
| 25 BCE – 10 CE | | | | Indo-Scythian dynasty of the APRACHARAJAS; Vijayamitra (ruled 12 BCE - 15 CE) (Note: From the dated inscription on the Rukhana reliquary) | Liaka Kusulaka; Patika Kusulaka; Zeionises | Kharahostes (ruled 10 BCE– 10 CE) (Note: An Inscribed Silver Buddhist Reliquary of the Time of King Kharaosta and Prince Indravarman, Richard Salomon, Journal of the American Oriental Society, Vol. 116, No. 3 (Jul. - Sep., 1996), pp. 442); Mujatria | Strato II and Strato III | Hagana |
| 10-20 CE | | INDO-PARTHIAN KINGDOM; Gondophares | | Indravasu | INDO-PARTHIAN KINGDOM; Gondophares | | Rajuvula | |
| 20-30 CE | | | Ubouzanes; Pakores | Vispavarma (ruled c.0-20 CE) (Note: A Kharosthī Reliquary Inscription of the Time of the Apraca Prince Visnuvarma, by Richard Salomon, South Asian Studies 11 1995, Pages 27-32, Published online: 09 Aug 2010) | Sarpedones | | Bhadayasa | Sodasa |
| 30-40 CE | | | KUSHAN EMPIRE; Kujula Kadphises | Indravarma | Abdagases | | ... | ... |
| 40-45 CE | | | | Aspavarma | Gadana | | ... | ... |
| 45-50 CE | | | | Sasan | Sases | | ... | ... |
| 50-75 CE | | | | | | | ... | ... |
| 75-100 CE | Indo-Scythian dynasty of the WESTERN SATRAPS; Chastana | | Vima Takto | | | | ... | ... |
| 100-120 CE | Abhiraka | | Vima Kadphises | | | | ... | ... |
| 120 CE | Bhumaka; Nahapana | PARATARAJAS; Yolamira | Kanishka I | | | | Great Satrap Kharapallana and Satrap Vanaspara for Kanishka I | |
| 130-230 CE | Jayadaman; Rudradaman I Damajadasri I Jivadaman; Rudrasimha I Satyadaman; Jivadaman; Rudrasena I | Bagamira; Arjuna; Hvaramira; Mirahvara | Vāsishka (c. 140 – c. 160); Huvishka (c. 160 – c. 190); Vasudeva I (c. 190 – to at least 230) | | | | | |
| 230-280 CE | Samghadaman; Damasena; Damajadasri II; Viradaman; Isvaradatta; Yasodaman I Vijayasena; Damajadasri III; Rudrasena II; Visvasimha | Miratakhma; Kozana; Bhimarjuna; Koziya; Datarvharna; Datarvharna | INDO-SASANIANS; Ardashir I, Sassanid king and "Kushanshah" (c. 230 – 250); Peroz I, "Kushanshah" (c. 250 – 265); Hormizd I, "Kushanshah" (c. 265 – 295) | | | Kanishka II (c. 230 – 240); Vashishka (c. 240 – 250); Kanishka III (c. 250 – 275) | | |
| 280-300 CE | Bhratadarman | Datayola II | Hormizd II, "Kushanshah" (c. 295 – 300) | | | Vasudeva II (c. 275 – 310) | | |
| 300-320 CE | Visvasena; Rudrasimha II; Jivadaman | | Peroz II, "Kushanshah" (c. 300 – 325) | | | Vasudeva III; Vasudeva IV; Vasudeva V Chhu (c. 310? – 325) | | |
| 320-388 CE | Yasodaman II; Rudradaman II; Rudrasena III; Simhasena; Rudrasena IV | | Shapur II Sassanid king and "Kushanshah" (c. 325); Varhran I, Varhran II, Varhran III "Kushanshahs" (c. 325 – 350); Peroz III "Kushanshah" (c. 350 –360); HEPHTHALITE/ HUNAS invasions | | | Shaka I (c. 325 – 345); Kipunada (c. 345 – 375) | | GUPTA EMPIRE; Chandragupta I Samudragupta |
| 388-395 CE | Rudrasimha III | | Chandragupta II | | | | | |
