= Yasodaman II =

Western Satrap sub-king from 317 to 332

- Western Satrap king
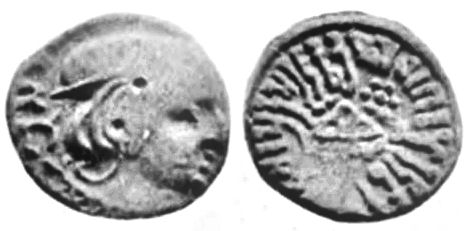
- Coin of Yasodaman II.
- Reign: 317–332
- Predecessor: Rudrasimha II
- Successor: Rudradaman II
- Father: Rudrasimha II

Western Satrap territory extended from the west coast of India to Vidisha/ Sanchi and Eran, from the time of Rudrasena II (256–278) well into the 4th century.

Yasodhaman II (317–332) was a son and probably sub-king of king Rudrasimha II of the Western Satraps. He declared on his coins to be the son of Rudrasimha II.

Yasodaman was succeeded by another of Rudrasimha II's sons Rudradaman II (332–348).

During his rule, a Saka ruler inscribed the Kanakerha inscription, on the hill of Sanchi mentioning the construction of a well by the Saka chief and "righteous conqueror" (dharmaviyagi mahadandanayaka) Sridharavarman (339-368 CE). Another inscription of the same Sridhavarman with his military commander is known from Eran. These inscription point to the extent of Saka rule as the time of Rudrasimha II and Yasodhaman II.
