= Devni Mori =

Archaeological site in Gujarat, India

Devnimori
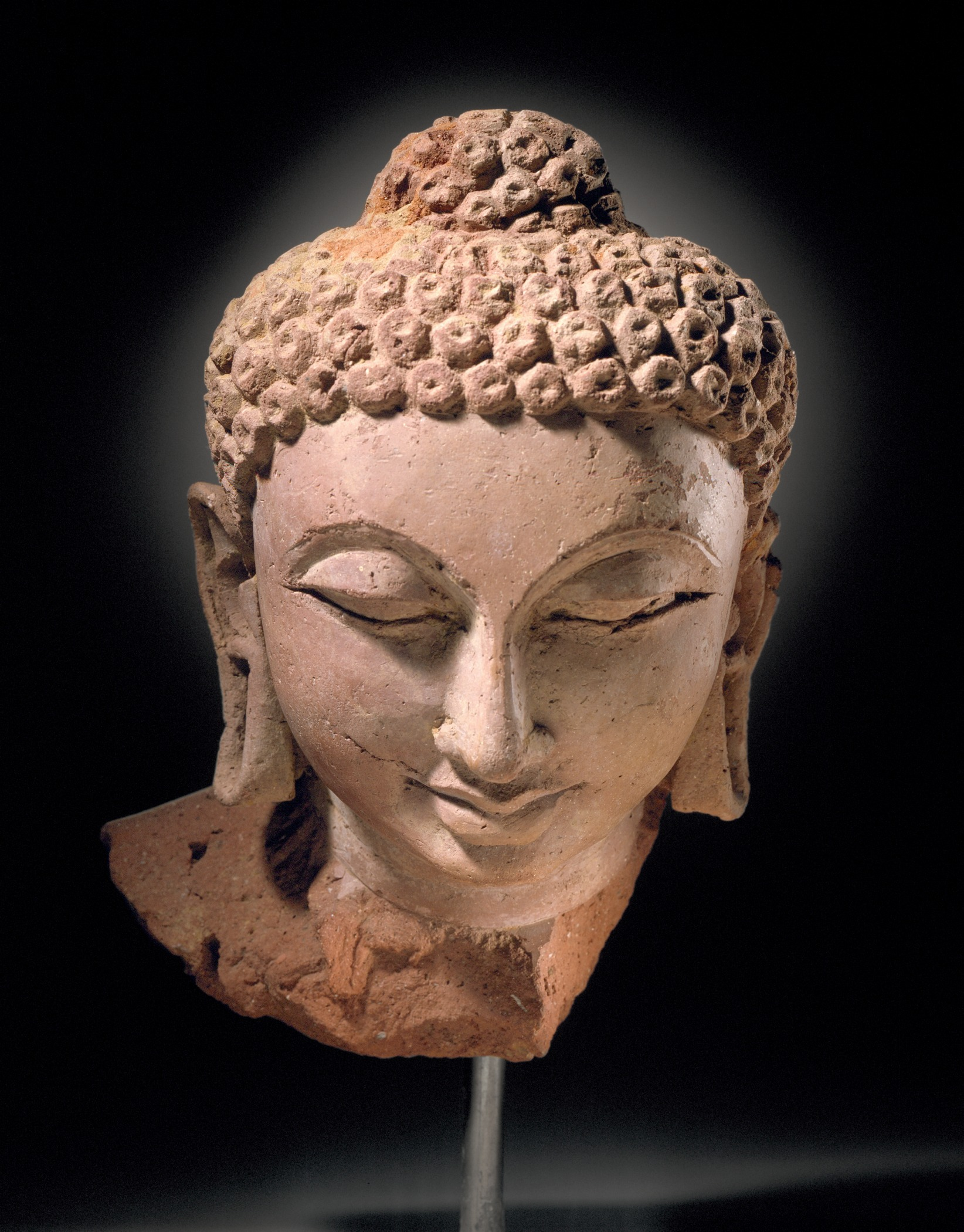
- Terracotta head of Buddha Shakyamuni, Devnimori (375-400).

- Location within India Location within Gujarat
- 23.670001°N 73.396319°E
- Type: Monastery and stupa
- Cultures: Western Satraps
- Location: Gujarat, India

History
- Built: 4th century CE

Devnimori, or Devni Mori, is a Buddhist archaeological site in northern Gujarat, about 2 kilometres (1.2 mi) from the city of Shamlaji, in the Aravalli District of northern Gujarat, India. The site is variously dated to the 3rd century or 4th century CE, or circa 400 CE. Its location was associated with trade routes and caravans in the area of Gujarat. Site excavations have yielded Buddhist artifacts dated prior to 8th-century in the lowest layer, mixed Buddhist and Hindu artwork from the Gurjara-Pratihara period in the middle, topped by Muslim glazed ware attributed to the 14th century. The site was excavated between 1960 and 1963. The site became flooded by the Meshwo reservoir, a project started in 1959 and completed between 1971–1972 over the nearby Meshwo River.

== Archaeological finds ==
=== Viharas ===
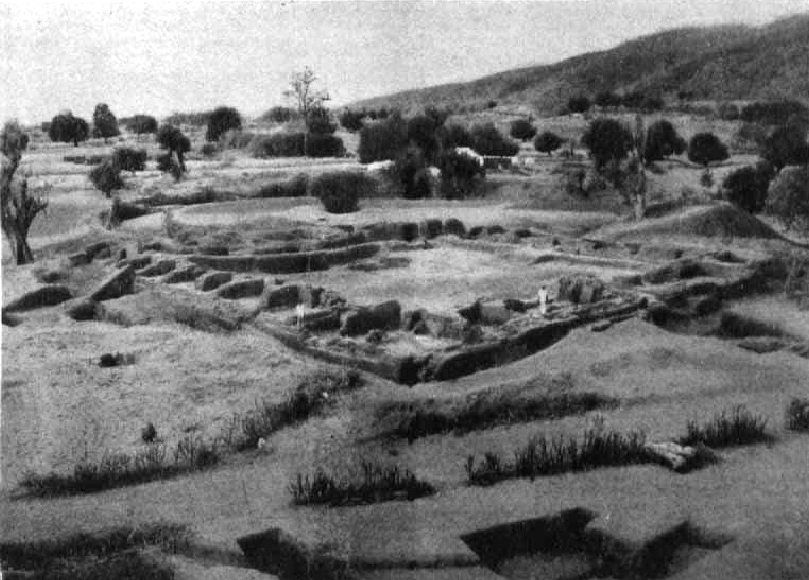
Devnimori Vihara

The excavation in 1960 revealed two viharas designed in Chatushala (quadrangular) layout. Devni Mori has a specific construction pattern for a monastery, with an image shrine built opposite the entrance. This kind of arrangement was initiated in northwestern sites such as Kalawan (in the Taxila area) or Dharmarajika. It is thought that this architectural pattern then became the prototype for the later development of monasteries with shrines in Devni Mori, Ajanta, Aurangabad, Ellora, Nalanda, Ratnagiri, Odisha, and others. The viharas in Devni Mori were built from fired bricks.

Vihara I, known as the Mahavihara, situated south of the main stupa, was a single-storied burnt-brick monastery built on natural black clay. It featured approximately thirty residential cells arranged around an inner verandah and an open central courtyard paved diagonally with bricks. The primary entrance was located at the center of the northern façade, while Room 16—the largest chamber at 25 feet 10 inches in length—served as the monastery's shrine room. On the western verandah, archaeologists uncovered a raised brick platform, Vyakhyana-Pitha decorated with triangular-cut bricks, which was likely utilized for reciting sutras and holding ceremonial assemblies. The structure was covered by a pent-roof of rectangular and triangular terracotta tiles secured with iron nails and contained integrated brick and stone water drains to discharge monsoon runoff. Stratigraphically, Vihara I underwent three major phases of construction and expansion prior to its destruction and abandonment; the subsequent installation of a small hearth in Room 22 indicates secondary, small-scale industrial or metalworking activity after its primary monastic use ceased.

Vihara II, located approximately 500 feet (150 m) east of Vihara I, was erected as a smaller copy of the main monastery at a later date. Built of burnt brick set in mud masonry, Vihara II similarly consisted of residential cells surrounding a central open courtyard with diagonal brick paving. Its main entrance faced west toward the Mahastupa, and its outer verandah was embellished near the top angle with a decorative horizontal band of saw-tooth moldings. A drainage channel in the south-western corner of the courtyard was floored with polished schist slabs. Stratigraphic evidence recorded three distinct phases for Vihara II: initial construction on black earth, subsequent structural additions, and eventual destruction.

Devni Mori also has residential caves with water cisterns, as at Uparkot in Junagadh.

=== Stupa ===
Devni Mori also has a stupa where stacked relic deposits were found. This is the only case of a free-standing stupa in the area of Gujarat. Nine images of the Buddha were found inside the stupa. The Buddha images clearly show the influence of the Greco-Buddhist art of Gandhara, and have been described as examples of the Western Indian art of the Western Satraps.

The stupa was constructed on a sloping natural black clay foundation comprising brickbats, gravel, and rammed kankar (yellowish clay). Built using well-fired burnt bricks laid in mud mortar, the monument reached an approximate height of 37 feet (11 m) above the surrounding ground level. On plan, the Mahastupa features a tiered, square-terraced configuration consisting of three distinct platforms surmounted by a central hemispherical dome.

The lowermost base platform measures 86 feet (26 m) on each side and stands 8 feet (2.4 m) high. Its exterior façade is divided into eleven bays on each side by decorative brick pilasters featuring purna-ghata (pot-shaped bases) and floral capitals, and the top of this platform forms an 8 feet (2.4 m) wide pradakshina-patha (circumambulatory pathway). Set back 8 feet (2.4 m) from the edge of the first tier, the second platform measures 70 feet (21 m) square and 10 feet (3.0 m) high, with each façade divided into nine bays featuring arched and stilted niches that once held terracotta statues of the Buddha seated in dhyana mudra (meditation posture). A third, smaller square tier measuring 54 feet (16 m) on each side serves as the base for the cylindrical drum and dome, which spans 54 feet (16.5 m) in diameter and 13 feet (4.0 m) in height. The crowning chhatravali (umbrella structure) and harmika (pinnacle), which were likely constructed of timber, have not survived.

To the east of the main structure lies an oblique brick platform measuring 88 feet (26.8 m) in length containing multiple irregular post-holes, which have been interpreted as fixture points for ceremonial flagpoles. Additionally, a protective wall composed of quartzite boulders faced with brick was erected along the northern and western sides near the Meshwo River to safeguard the stupa and its adjacent monastery from floods.

=== Coins ===
Excavations at Devni Mori yielded a total of 69 coins, providing key numismatic evidence for establishing the site's economic activity, trade contacts, and occupational chronology. The assemblage comprises 59 silver alloy coins, 4 silver-coated copper coins, 2 copper coins, and 4 lead coins. The collection is predominantly composed of issues from the Western Kshatrapa dynasty, alongside a small number of Maitraka and Indo-Sassanian specimens, while coins of the Gupta dynasty are absent from the site. Of the total yield, 54 coins were unearthed directly from dated archaeological layers, while 5 were found on the surface.

The Vihara I hoard consists of 39 Kshatrapa silver coins discovered inside a small red earthen pot buried in a yellow silt filling near the entrance of Cell 1, assigned to Phase II of the monastery's construction. The Stupa core deposit features a globular pot sealed inside the core of the Stupa at Course No. 35 on Platform I, containing 8 silver Kshatrapa coins, gold and silver foils, and fragments of a blue glass bottle. Because the newest coin in this group dates to the reign of Kshatrapa Vishvasena (294/295–305 CE), the stupa core must have been built no earlier than the 4th century CE. Additionally, a silver coin attributed to the Maitraka king Sri Sarvvabhattaraka was recovered from the mud-mortar of the final structural repairs on Platform II of the Mahastupa, dating those later repairs to the 6th century CE.

Of the 59 Western Kshatrapa coins recovered from the site, complete or partial legends were deciphered on 32 specimens. The obverse typically displays a profile bust of the king facing right, while the reverse features a central three-arched chaitya symbol. A Brahmi legend in Sanskritized Prakrit encircles the design in a clockwise direction. Identified rulers include Mahakshatrapa Rudrasena I (r. 203–220 CE), Mahakshatrapa Rudrasena II (r. 258–270 CE), Kshatrapa Bhartrdaman (r. 277/278–295 CE), Kshatrapa Vishvasena (r. 294/295–305 CE), Kshatrapa Rudrasimha II (r. 305–313 CE), Kshatrapa Yashodaman II (r. 317–332 CE), and Mahakshatrapa Svami Rudrasena III (r. 348–378 CE).

Three coins are attributed to the Maitrakas of Valabhi, comprising two silver alloy coins and one silver-coated copper coin. The obverse depicts the head of a king, while the reverse features a central trident surrounded by a circular Brahmi legend. Two damaged silver-alloy Indo-Sassanian coins were also recovered from the site. The obverse displays an adorned bust in a Sassanian style, whereas the reverse features a stylized fire altar flanked by figures.

=== Statues of Buddha ===
Excavations at the Devni Mori Mahastupa yielded 26 terracotta Buddha statues and structural fragments. These figures were originally placed in decorative niches on the stupa's second tier and later sealed within its inner core masonry. The statues depict the seated Buddha in the padmāsana posture and the dhyānamudrā hand gesture, featuring meditative, downcast eyes and lotus thrones. The figures wear an uttariya monastic robe covering both shoulders, characterized by symmetrical drapery folds across the torso and legs. Stylistically, the sculptures reflect a synthesis of Gandharan artistic conventions adapted to regional Western Indian traditions. The remains are located in the Shamlaji Museum and Baroda Museum & Picture Gallery.

== Dates and influences ==
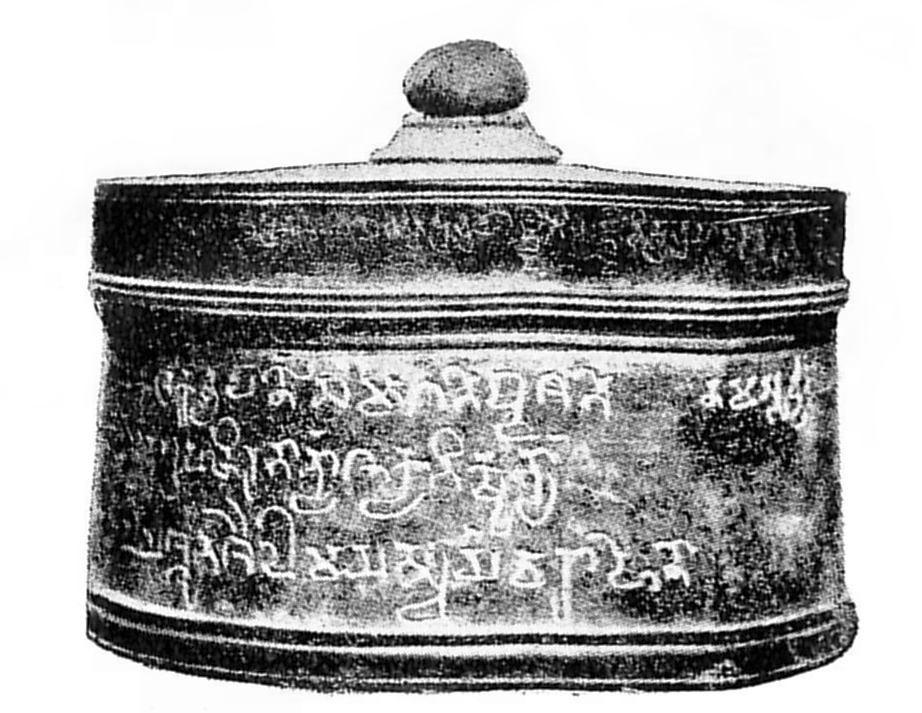
Stone Relic Casket recovered from Devni Mori, in the name of the Western Satraps king Rudrasena.

Three relics caskets were retrieved from the stupa. One of these caskets bears an inscription that mentions a date: the 127th year in the reign of Western Satrap ruler Rudrasena:

"In the year 127 of the Kathika kings, when king Rudrasena was ruling, the erection of this stupa, which was banner of this earth, was done. It was the 5th day of Bhadrapada."

— Translation by Professor S.N. Choudhary

As Western Satraps dated their coins in the Saka era, this date would be 204 CE, and the ruler would be Rudrasena I. If reckoned with the Kalachuri Era, the date would be 375 CE and the ruler Rudrasena III.

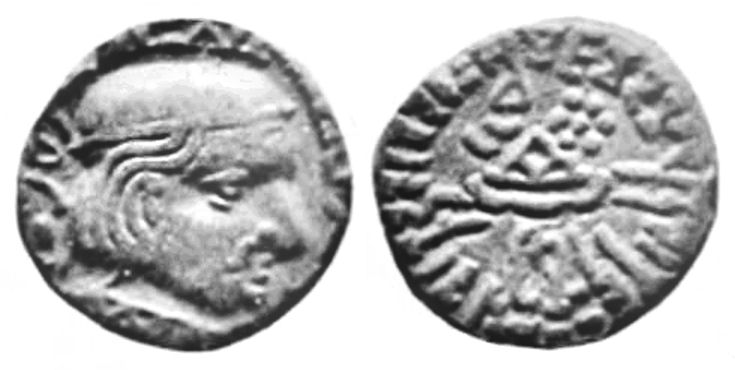
A coin of Rudrasimha II (305-313 CE), similar to the one discovered in the Devnimori stupa.

A second casket included eight coins of Western Satraps rulers, one of them being a coin of Western Satrap ruler Visvasena (294-305). The coins are worn, but the coins of two other rulers have been found in the group: one coin of Rudrasena I (203-220 CE) and a nearly unworn coin of Rudrasimha (305-313 CE). Overall, and because of these different dates, the site of Devni Mori is sometimes dated to the 3rd century, and sometimes to the 4th century. The absence of later Western Satraps coins and the various dates could however suggest that the stupa was rebuilt at one point, with a final construction date not long after 305–313.

According to Mehta and Chawdhary, the art of Devni Mori proves the existence of a pre-Gupta era Western Indian artistic tradition. This tradition, they suggest may have influenced the art of the Ajanta Caves, Sarnath and other places from the 5th century onward. As a matter of fact, Devni Mori represents the extension of Gandharan influence to the subcontinent, which persisted locally with the sites of Mīrpur Khās, Śāmalājī or Dhānk, a century before this influence would further extend to Ajanta and Sarnath.

Shah disagrees and states that instead of this "so-called pre-Gupta influence", the Gandhara arts influenced these, while Gupta art was influenced by the pre-Gupta era Western tradition. According to Schastok, the significance of the finding here is that there were multiple centers involved. According to Williams, it is difficult to accept either these theories because "any number of the features had been in use too long to have chronological significance" and the Western Indian tradition could very well have been a combination of local innovation combined with influences from the Mathura school.

== Gallery ==
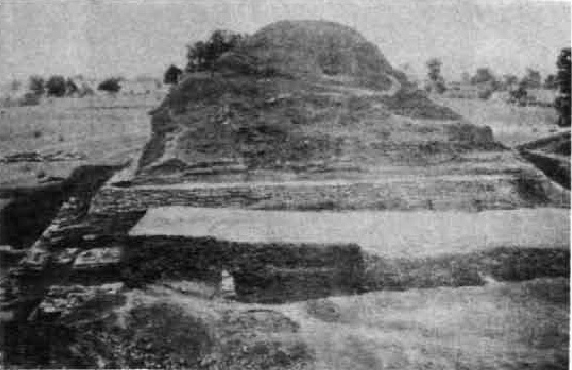
Devnimori Stupa

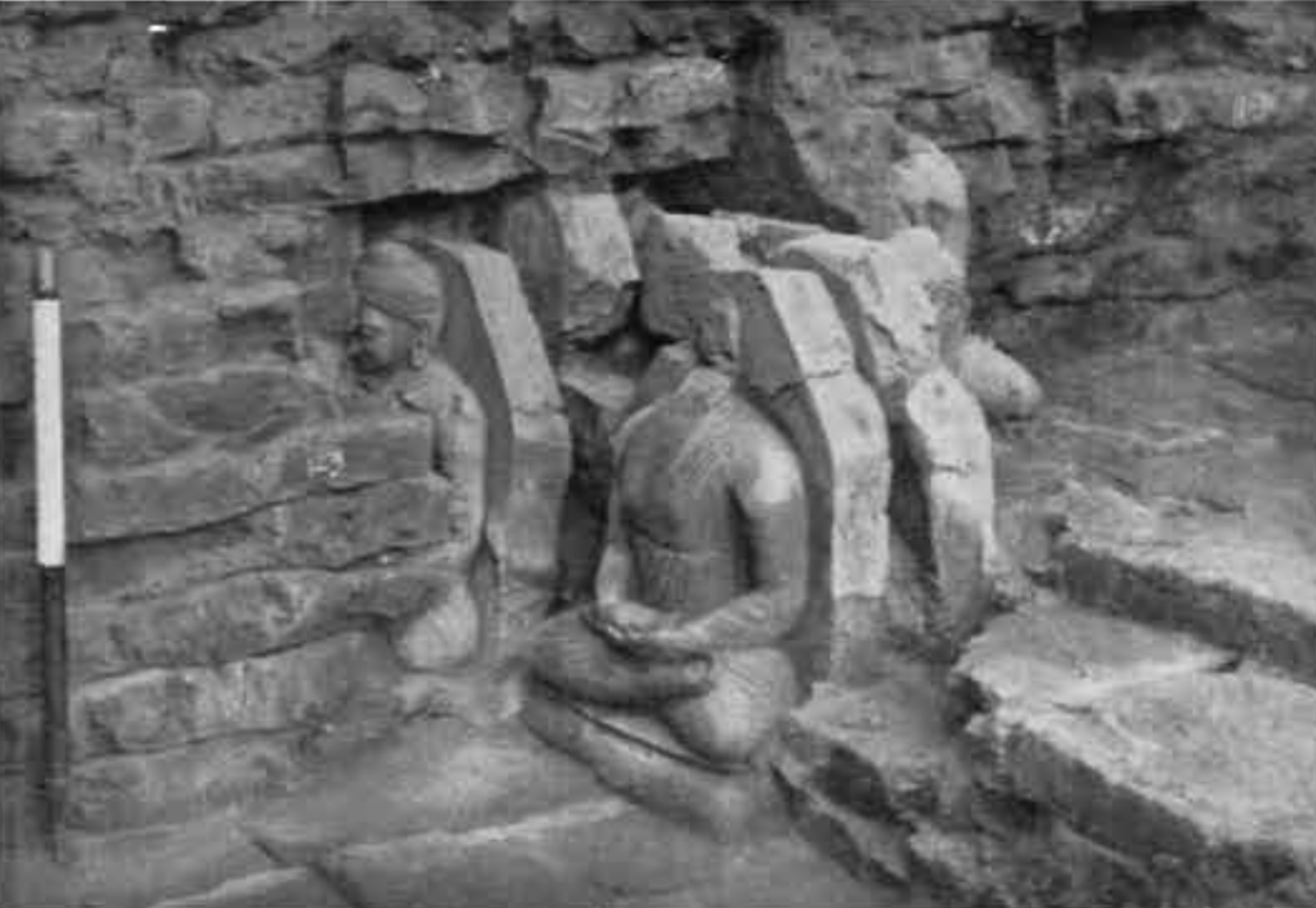
Terracotta Buddha statues, possibly 375 CE.

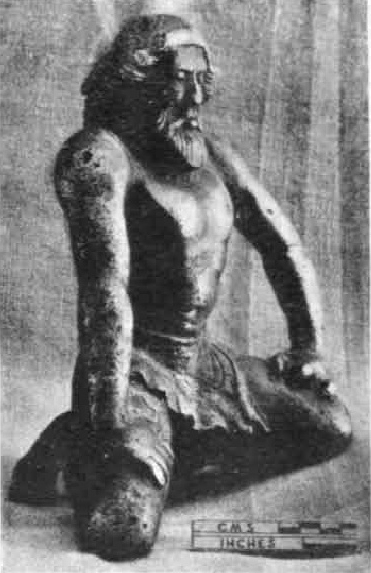
Bronze figure of Atlantes, Devnimori.

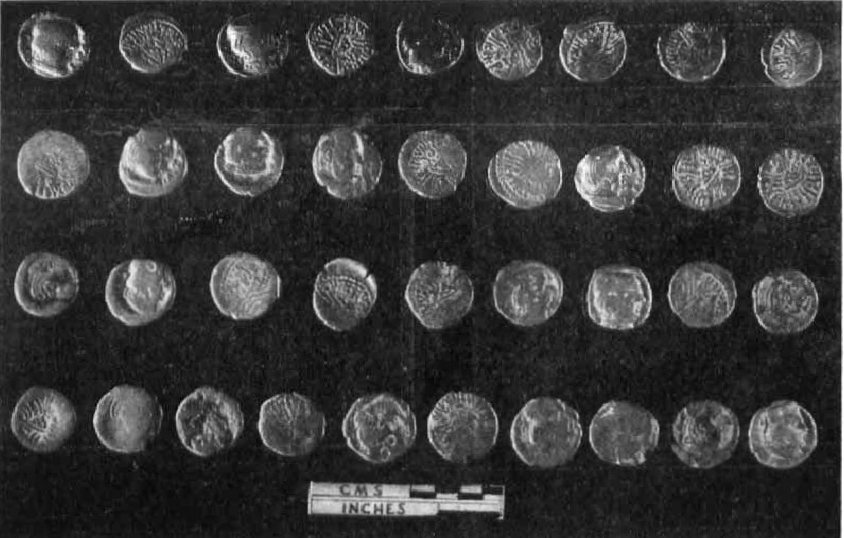
Devnimori Kshatrapa coins

== See also ==
- Kahu-Jo-Darro

== Sources ==
- Ishikawa, Ken (2019). "More Gandhāra than Mathurā: substantial and persistent Gandhāran influences provincialized in the Buddhist material culture of Gujarat and beyond, c. AD 400-550" in "The Global Connections of Gandhāran Art". pp. 156ff.
