= Kalawan =

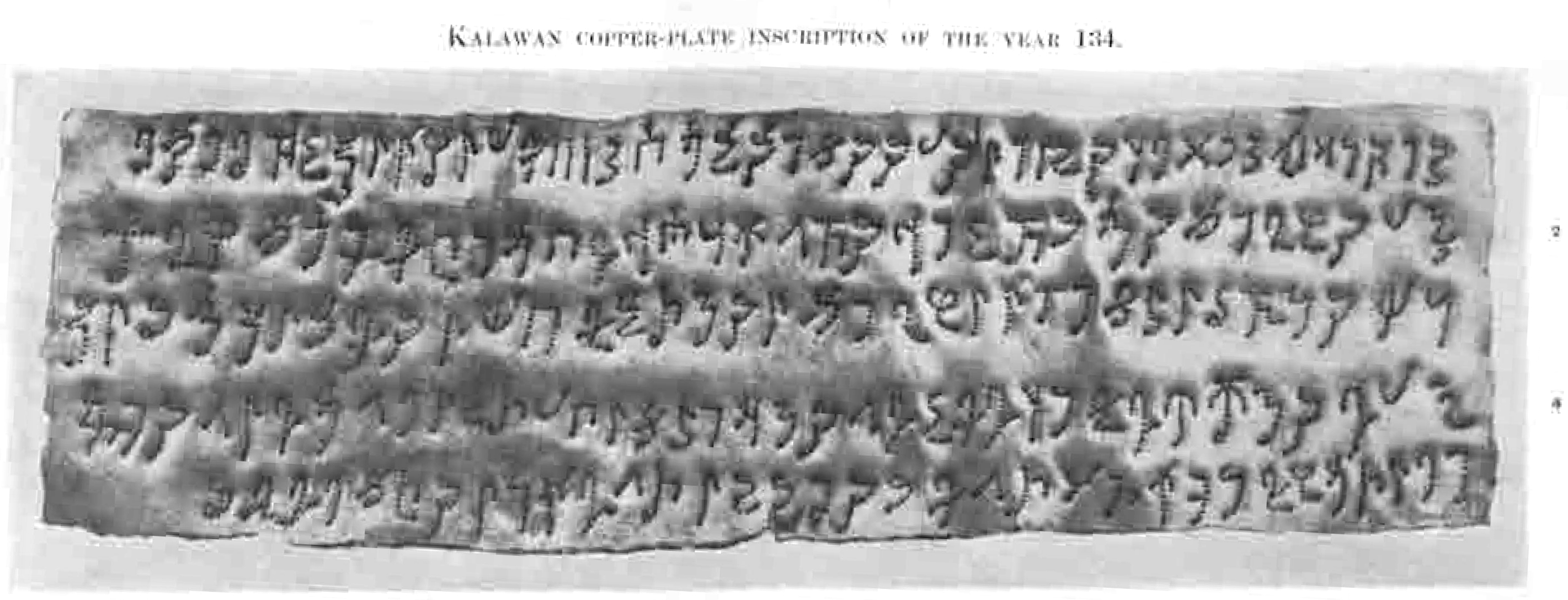
- Copper-plate inscription mentioning the Sarvastivadas, in the year 134 of the Azes era, i.e. 84 CE, Kalawan, Taxila.

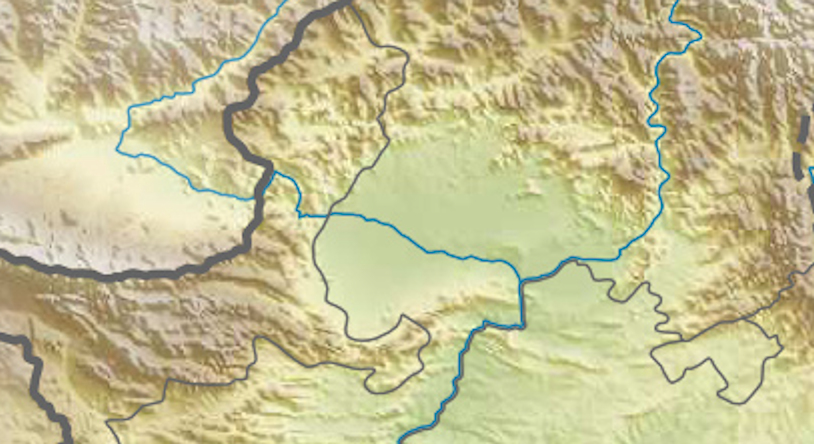
- Location within Pakistan Location within Gandhara

Religion
- Affiliation: Buddhism
- Region: Gandhara
- Ecclesiastical or organizational status: Stupa and vihara ruins
- Year consecrated: 2nd century CE
- Status: Artifacts removed

Location
- Location: Pakistan
- Interactive map of Kalawan
- Coordinates: 33.727835°N 72.853069°E

Kalawan (originally meaning "The caves") is the name of an archaeological site in the area of Taxila in Pakistan, where it is one of the largest Buddhist establishment. It is located about 2 km from the Dharmarajika stupa.

Kalawan has a vihara monastery, which is the largest in northern India. An inscription, recording the enshrinement of relics as a gift to the Sarvastivadin School, was found in a chaitya hall mentioning the date of "the 134th year of Azes," which corresponds to 77 CE.

Small stupas were found inside the monasteries. The Kalawan monastery, together with the Dharmarajika display an original kind of architectural arrangement in which an image shrine is built opposite the entrance. It is thought that this architectural pattern was initiated in the northwest and then became the prototype for the later development of monasteries with shrines in Devnimori, Ajanta, Aurangabad, Ellora, Nalanda, Ratnagiri and others.
