= Rudrasimha III =

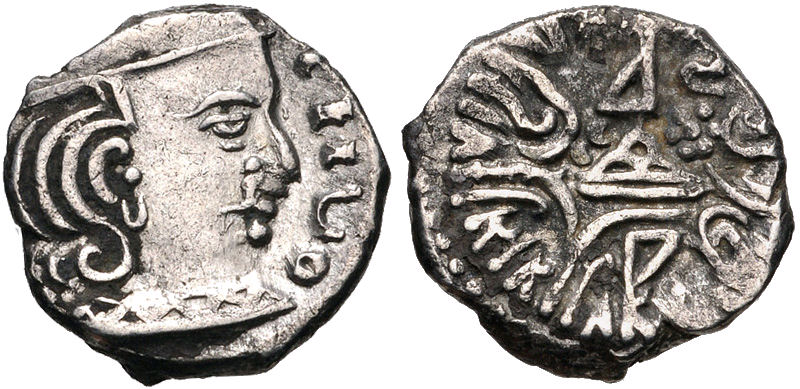
- Coin of Bhadramukhas ruler Rudrasimha III, circa 385-415 AD.

Western Satrap
- Reign: c. 388 – 415 AD
- Predecessor: Rudrasena IV
- Successor: Position disestablished
- Father: Satyasimha

Rudrasimha III (IAST: Rudrasiṃha) was the last ruler of the Western Satraps in India, in the 4th century AD. Rudrasimha III succeeded Rudrasena IV as the leader of the Indo-Scythians in India. Both were the sons of the Saka ruler Satyasimha, making them at least half-brothers, if not first-degree relatives.

The Western Satraps were ultimately conquered by the Gupta Emperor Chandragupta II. This event completely ended the rule of the Sakas on the Indian subcontinent. An inscriptions of the victorious Gupta king Chandragupta II in 412-413 AD, the Sanchi inscription of Chandragupta II, can be found on the railing near the Eastern Gateway of the Great Stupa in Sanchi.

== Sources ==
- Rapson, "A Catalogue of Indian coins in the British Museum. Andhras etc.."

Preceded by Rudrasena IV	Western Satrap; 388-415	Succeeded by Gupta Emperor Chandragupta II
