= Visvasena =

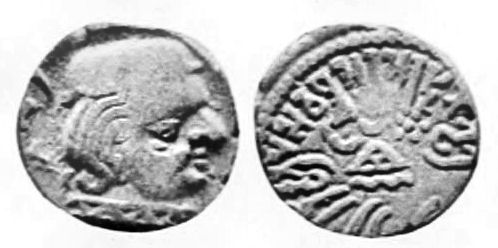
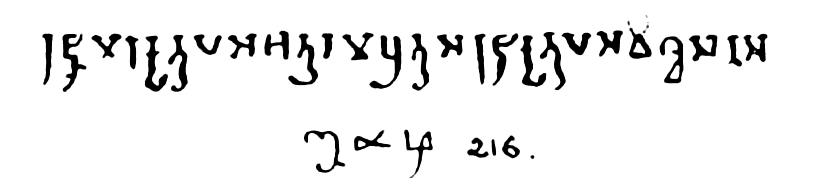
- Visvasena coin, and its legend in Brahmi, with a strike date (216) found on the obverse of some coins. The legend reads: Rājño Mahākshatrapasa Bhartṛidāmnaḥ putrasa Rājñaḥ Kshatrapasa Viçvasenasa "Of the Rajah and Satrap Visnasena, brother of the Rajah and Great Satrap Bhartrdaman".

Western Satraps
- Reign: 293-304 CE
- Predecessor: Bhartrdaman
- Successor: Rudrasimha II
- Father: Rudrasena II

Western Satrap territory extended from the west coast of India to Vidisha/ Sanchi and Eran, from the time of Rudrasena II (256–278) well into the 4th century. Marital alliances with the Ikshvaku of southern India are mentioned in inscriptions at Nagarjunakonda (3rd century CE).

Viśvasena (Middle Brahmi: Vi-śva-se-na, r.293–304 CE) was a ruler of the Western Satraps, and the 22nd ruler of the Kshatrapa dynasty. He was the last Kshatrapa ruler of the Chastana family, brother and successor to Bhartrdaman and son of Rudrasena II.

A coin of Visvasena was found in excavations at the Ajanta Caves, in the burnt-brick monastery facing the caves on the right bank of the river Waghora.

His successor was Rudrasimha II.

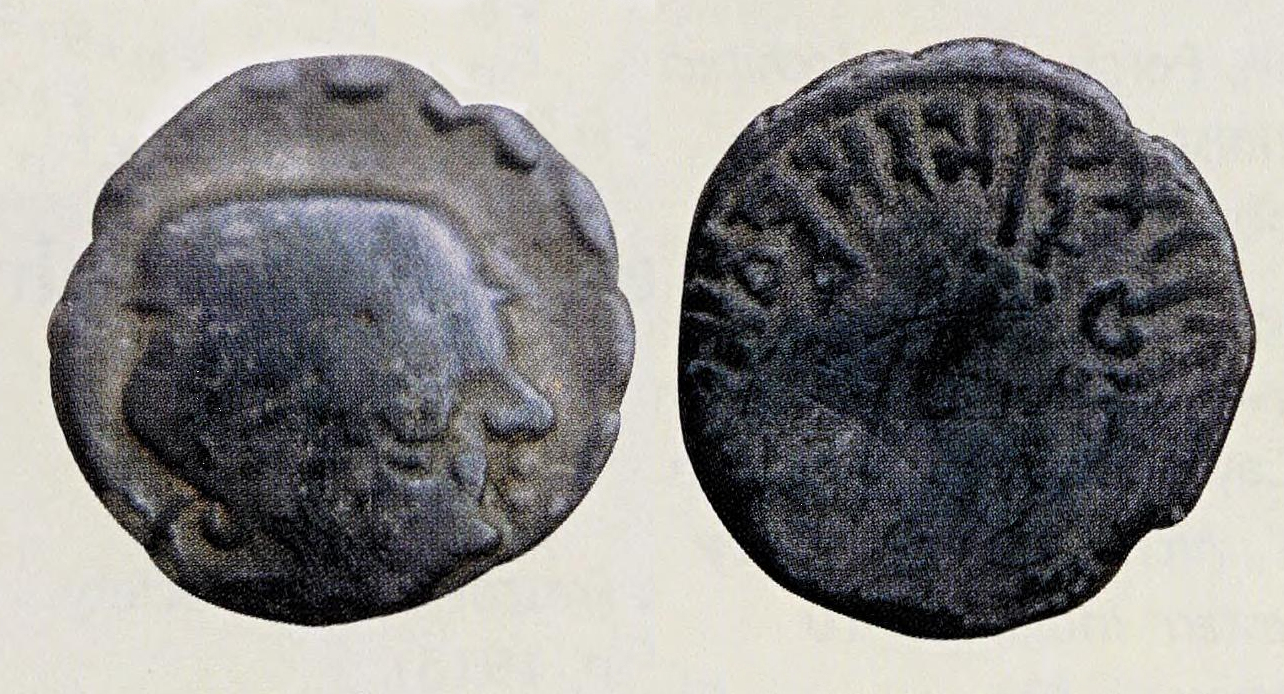
A coin of Visvasena, found in excavations at Ajanta Caves.

== Sources ==
- K. Krishna Murthy (1977). Nāgārjunakoṇḍā: A Cultural Study. Concept. OCLC 4541213.
