= Bhartrdaman =

- Western Satrap king
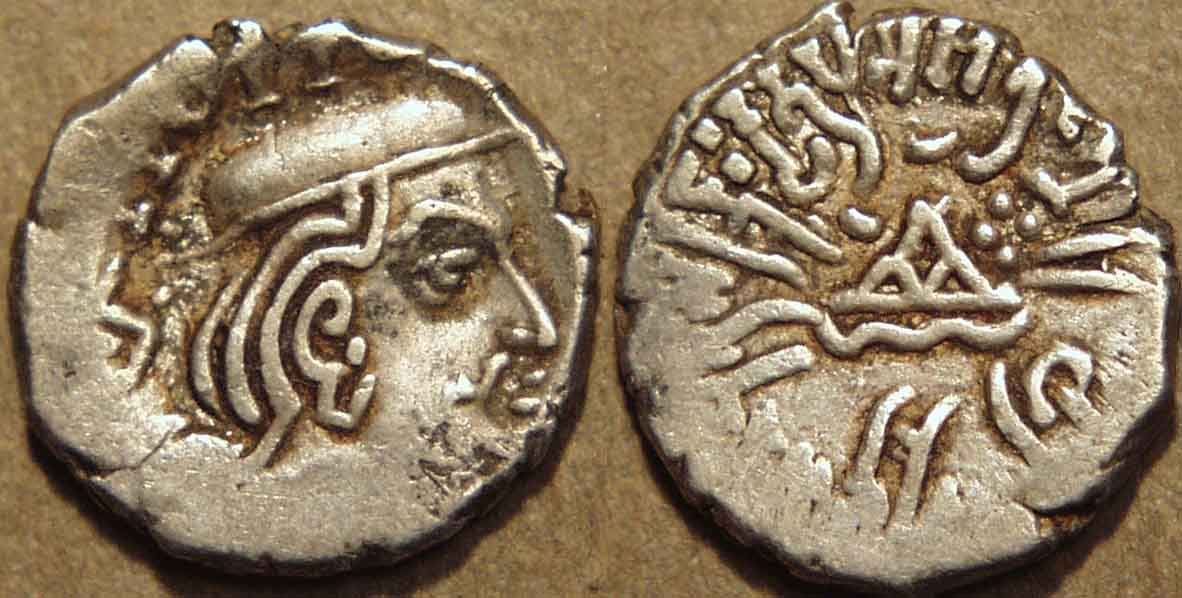
- Coin of the Western Kshatrapa ruler Bhartrdaman (278 to 295). Obv: Bust of Bhartrdaman, with corrupted Greek legend (Indo-Greek style), (Saka) date 200 (= 278 CE). Rev: Three-arched hill or Chaitya, with river, crescent and sun, within legend in Brahmi.
- Reign: 278-295 CE
- Predecessor: Visvasimha
- Successor: Visvasena
- Father: Rudrasena II

Bhartrdaman was a Saka ruler of the Western Kshatrapas in northwestern India from around 278 to 295. For the first four years, his coins name him only as kshatrapa, after which time his coins name him mahakshatrapa. He was the second of two sons of Rudrasena II who came to the throne, after his brother Visvasimha, and was among the last rulers of the Kardamaka dynasty.

Preceded by Visvasimha	Western Satrap; 282–295	Succeeded by Visvasena
