= Rudrasimha II =

Western Satrap king from 304 to 348

- Western Satrap king
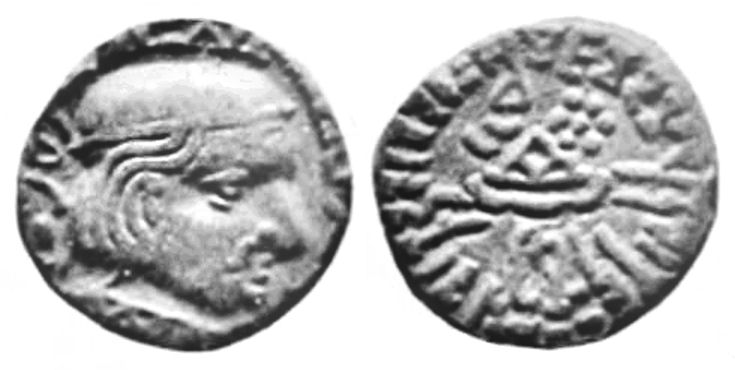
- Coin of Rudrasimha II.
- Reign: 304–348
- Predecessor: Visvasena
- Successor: Yasodaman II
- Died: 348
- Father: Svami-Jivadaman

Western Satrap territory extended from the west coast of India to Vidisha/ Sanchi and Eran, from the time of Rudrasena II (256–278) well into the 4th century.

Rudrasimha II (died 348) was a Saka ruler of the Western Satraps. He declared on his coins to be the son of a Lord (Svami) named Jivadaman.

His coinage is coeval with that of other rulers, who may have been sub-kings and were his sons: Yasodaman II (317–332) and Rudradaman II (332–348).

During his rule, a Saka ruler inscribed the Kanakerha inscription, on the hill of Sanchi mentioning the construction of a well by the Saka chief and "righteous conqueror" (dharmaviyagi mahadandanayaka) Sridharavarman (339-368 CE). Another inscription of the same Sridhavarman with his military commander is known from Eran. These inscription point to the extent of Saka rule as the time of Rudrasimha II.

Coins of Rudrasimha were found inside the Buddhist stupa of Devnimori in Gujarat.
