= Sridharavarman =

- Saka General, Great Satrap and King
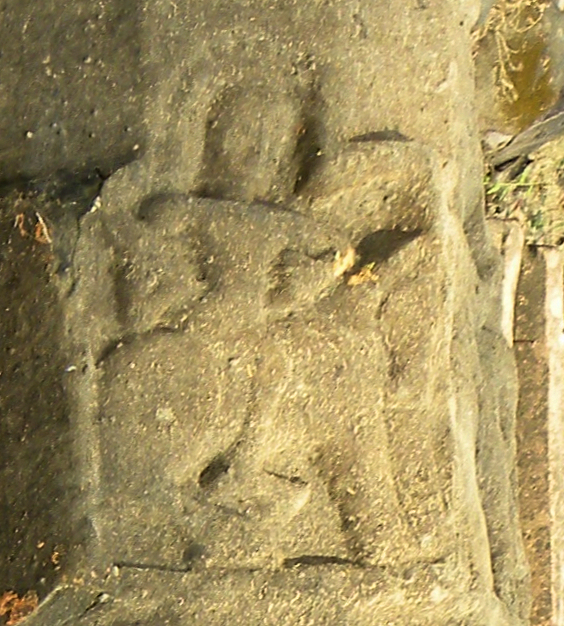
- Sridharavarman ruled in an area around Vidisha/Sanchi and Eran, where his inscriptions were found. Probable image of Satyanaga, Sridharavarman's general.
- Reign: Circa 339-368 CE

Sridharavarman (Gupta script:, Shri-dha-ra-va-rmma-na, ruled c. 339 – c. 368 CE) was a Saka (Indo-Scythian) ruler of Central India, around the areas of Vidisa, Sanchi and Eran in the 4th century CE, just before the Gupta Empire expansion in these areas. He calls himself a general and "righteous conqueror" (dharmaviyagi mahadandanayaka) in an inscription, and Rajan ('King') and Mahaksatrapa ('Great Satrap') in a probably later inscription at Eran, suggesting that he may have been a high-ranked officer who later rose to the rank of a King.

== Rule ==
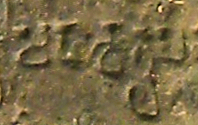
The "Mahakṣatrapa" title (Brahmi:) given to Sridharavarman in the Eran pillar inscription.

Although Sridharavarman took the title of Mahakshatrapa, the traditional title of the Western Satraps, he probably did not belong to the line of Chastana, the founder of the dynasty, and belonged to a different Saka family. He probably suffered a defeat by the Gupta Emperor Samudragupta around 365 CE, who then occupied the area around Eran and made his own victorious inscription there.

Sridharavarman is probably the "Saka" ruler mentioned in the Allahabad pillar inscription of Samudragupta, as having "paid homage" to the Gupta Emperor, forced to "self-surrender, offering (their own) daughters in marriage and a request for the administration of their own districts and provinces".

After submitting to Samudragupta, he and his successor may have ruled a bit longer in Eastern Malwa, until they were vanquished by Chandragupta II in his "conquest of the whole world".

== Inscriptions ==
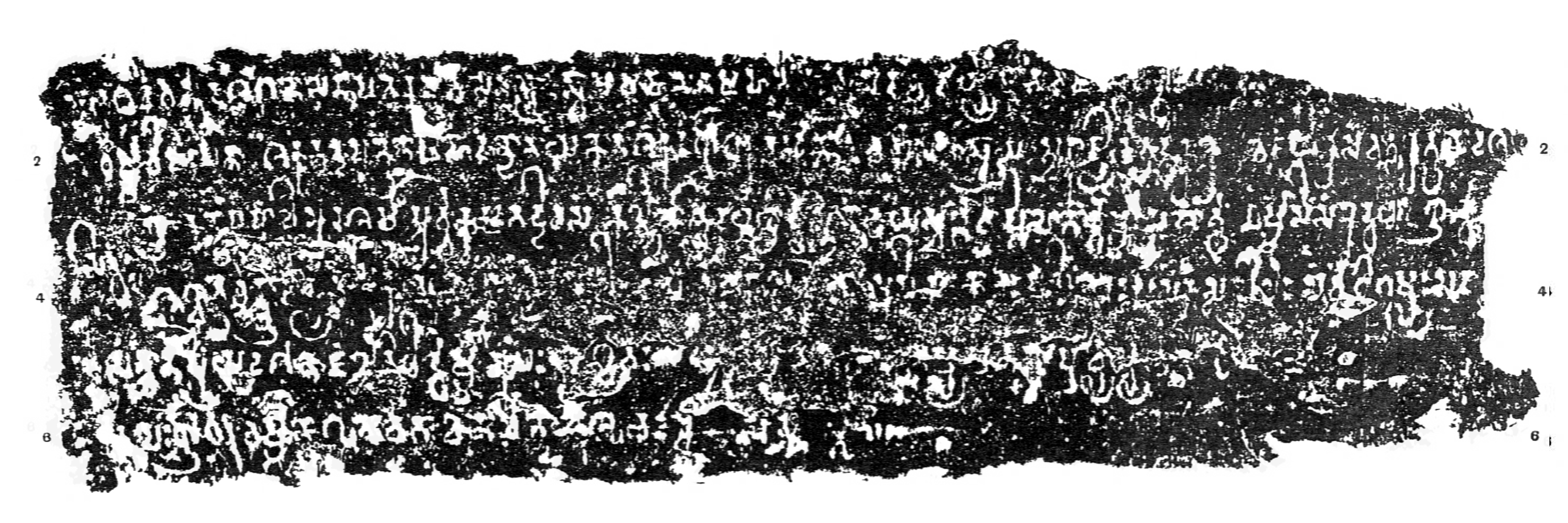
The Kanakerha inscription of Sridharavarman.

=== Kanakerha inscription ===
Sridharavarman is known from two inscriptions: the first one is the Kanakerha inscription at Sanchi.

=== Eran inscription ===
Eran pillar inscription of Sridharavarman

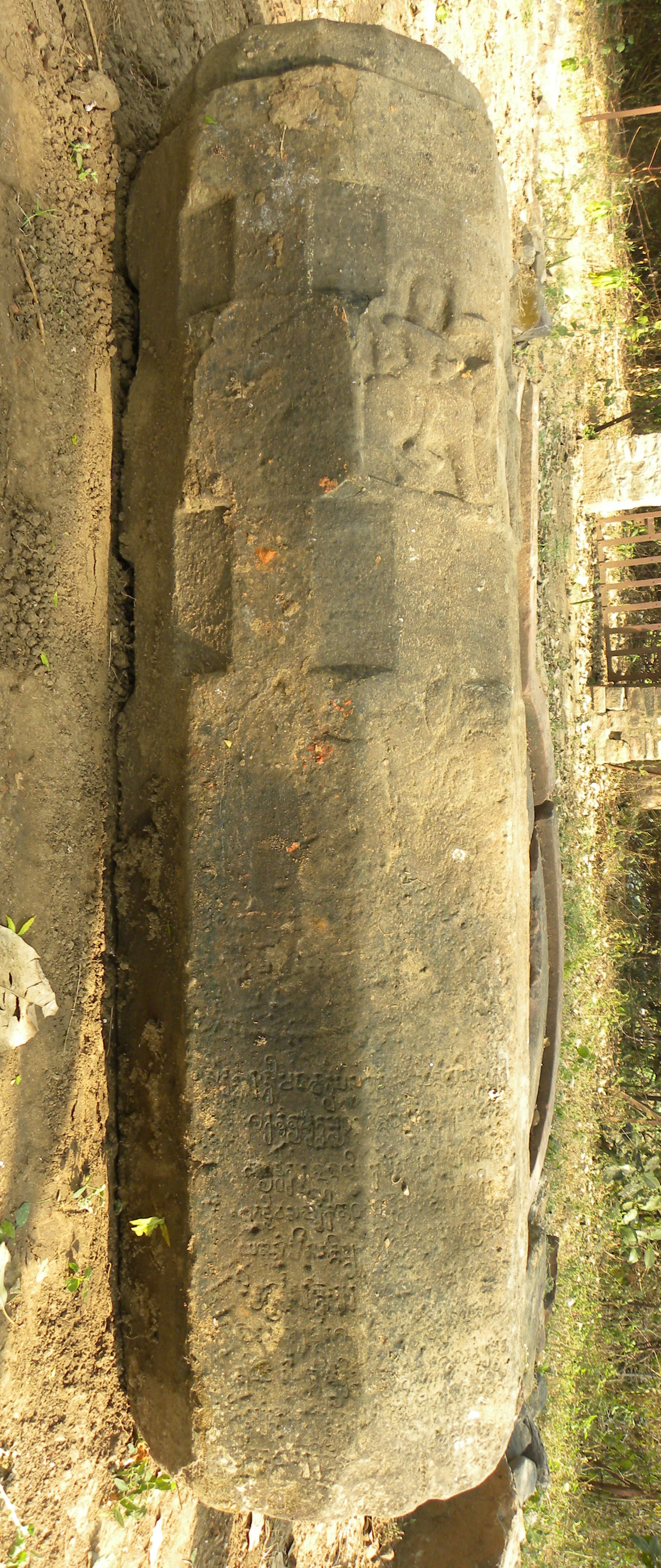
Pillar

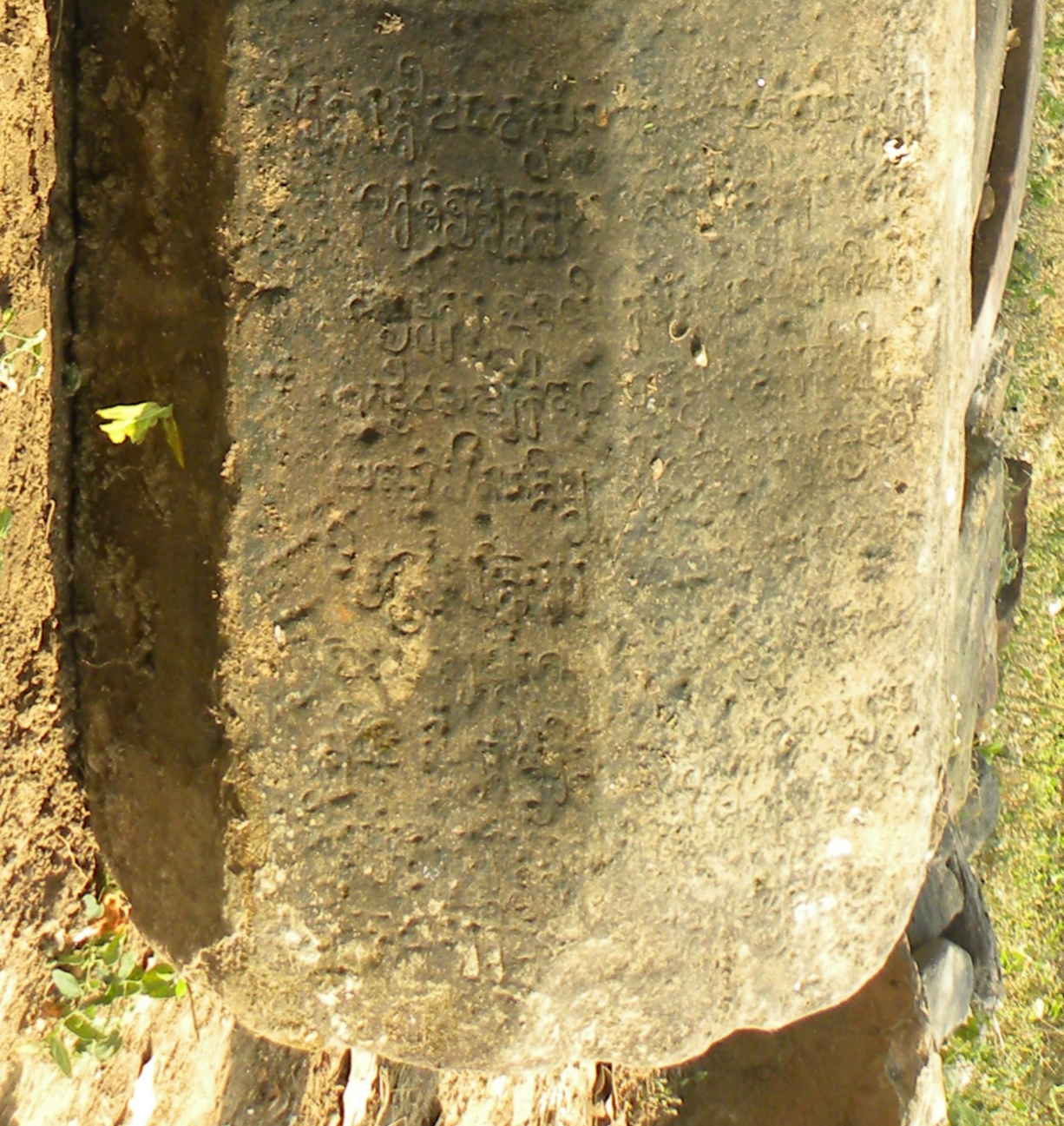
Inscription

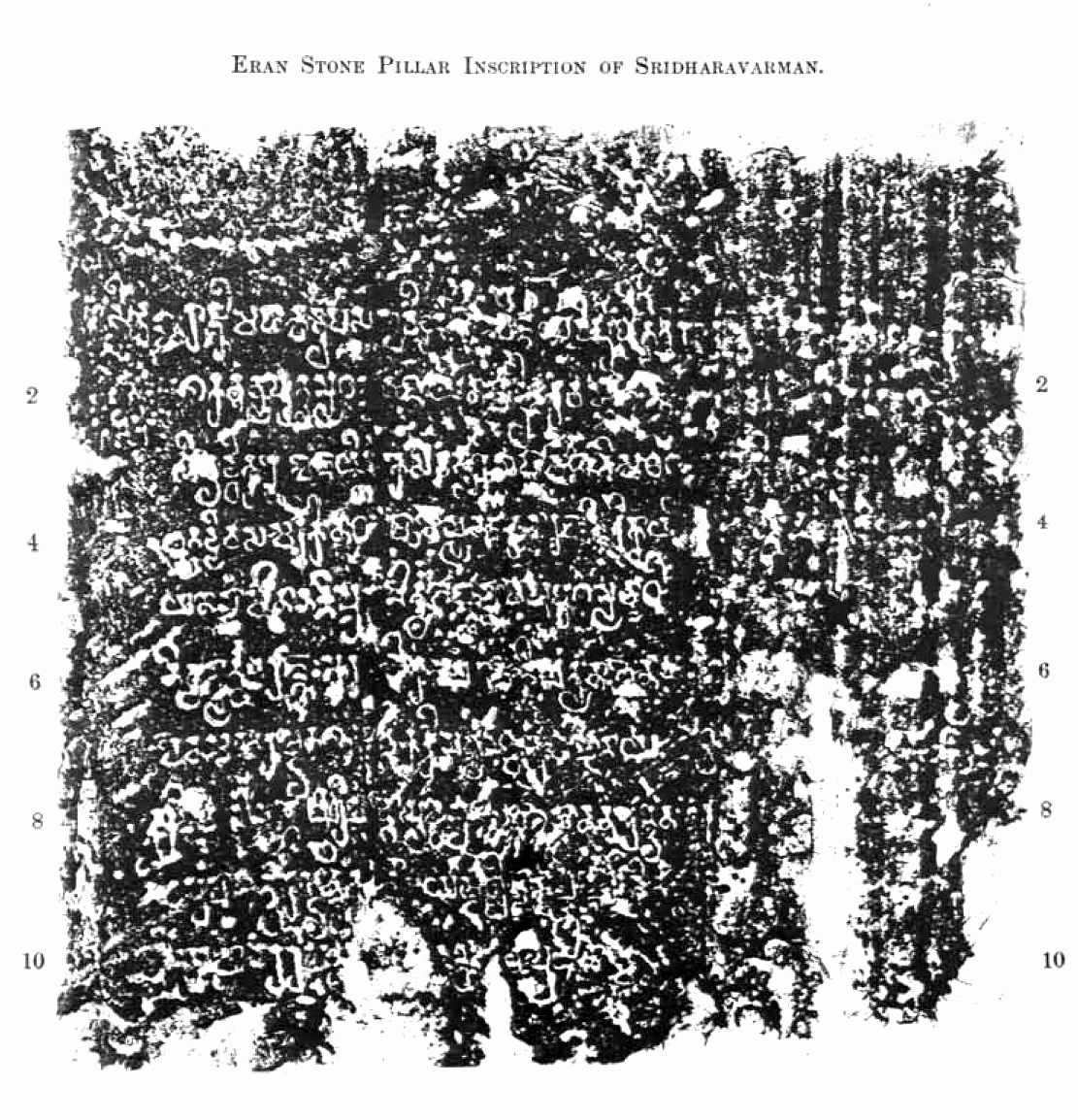
Rubbing

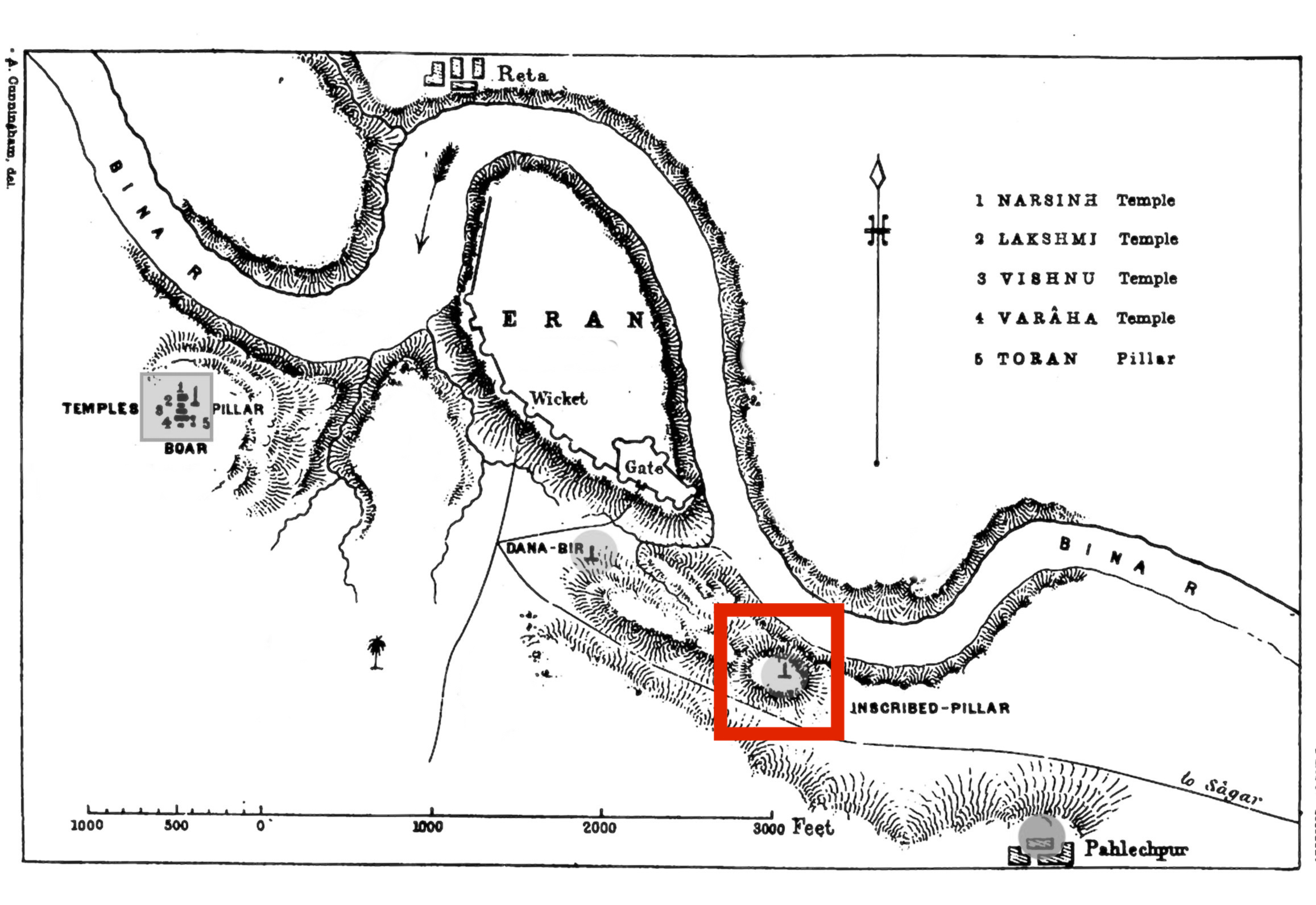
Location of the pillar of Sridharavarman with his inscription, in Eran. Coordinates: 24.0864°N 78.1762°E

Another inscription of the same Sridhavarman, made by his Naga General Satyanaga, was made on a pillar at Eran, only the top portion of which is remaining. The pillar is about 1 foot 6 inches in diameter. The inscription is dated to the 27th year of Sridharavarman's reign. Another famous inscription was later added on the same pillar, the inscription of Goparaja, who died in Eran during the rule of Gupta ruler Bhanugupta, who is also only known from this very inscription.

The Eran inscription of Sridharavarman reads:

Success! In the victorious twenty-seventh year, augmenting [his dominion for a thousand years] of the Rajan (and) Mahakshatrapa Sridharavarman, the son of the Saka Nanda —the righteous conqueror, who has obtained abundant fame by means of victories won by his valour, [who meditates on the feet of the divine Mahasena whose army has never been vanquished] on this day (namely) ... in the adhishthana (town) of Erikina in Bahirika in this ahara of Nagendra, a flight of steps [at the river Venva] [has been caused to be constructed] with devotion by [Nara]yanasvamin for the well-being of the adhishthana headed by the cows and the Brahmanas, (and) for the increase [of the religious merit of his mother and father].

[At the same adhishthana in his own bhoga there has been erected this yashti] by Satyanaga, the Senapati (General) and Arakshika of the King, who is a native of Maharashtra and is foremost of .... for the removal of calamities, for the attainment of prosperity and for the happiness and well-being of all creatures.

Moreover-

While (our) King is ruling over the wide earth ... may this yashti, (raised) by the Nagas themselves, remaining unimpaired, proclaim by its form the duty of the warlike people...; for this is the (meeting) place of (all) people - friends as well as foes - in (a spirit of) service and reverence!

— Translation by Vasudev Vishnu Mirashi (1955), "Inscriptions of the Kalachuri Chedi Era", Corpus Inscriptionum Indicarum

At Eran, it seems that this inscription is succeeded chronologically by a monument and an inscription by Gupta Empire's Samudragupta (r. c. 336 – c. 380 CE), established "for the sake of augmenting his fame", who may therefore have ousted Sridharavarman in his campaigns to the West.

== Connected rulers ==
While the Western Satrap Rudrasimha II ruled in the western India, the Gupta Emperor Samudragupta may have ousted Sridharavarman during his campaigns in Central India.

Seals with the names of other Saka rulers from Malwa in the 3rd century CE are known.

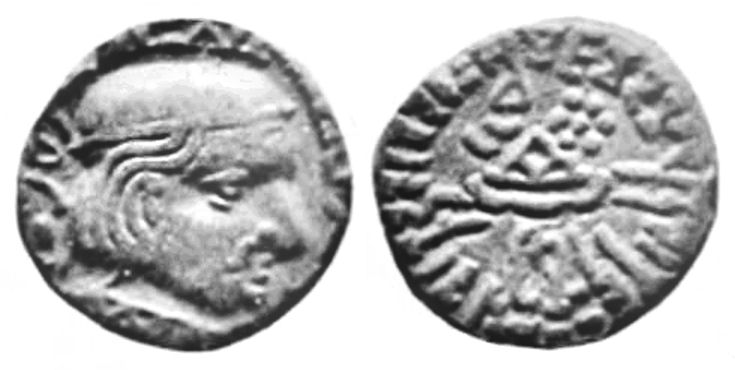
Rudrasimha II ruled the Western Satraps at the time of Sridharavarman.

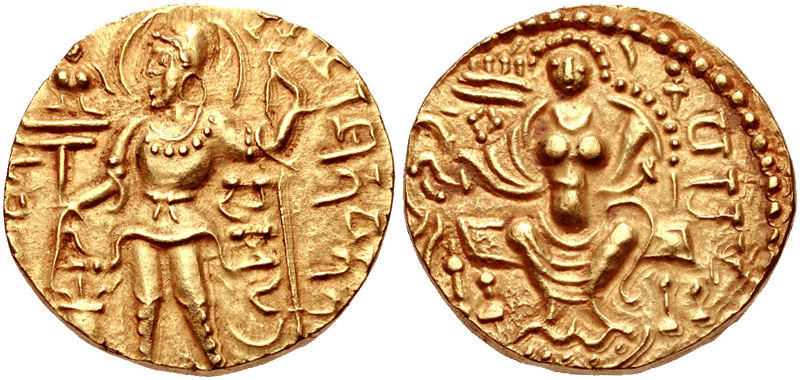
Samudragupta ruled in the East at the time of Sridharavarman.

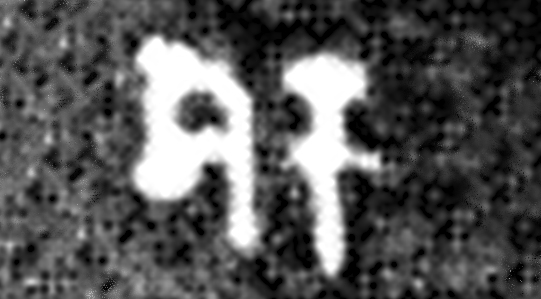
The vanquished "Śaka" mentioned by Samudragupta in the Allahabad pillar (Line 23) was probably Sridharavarman.
