= Sanchi Archaeological Museum =

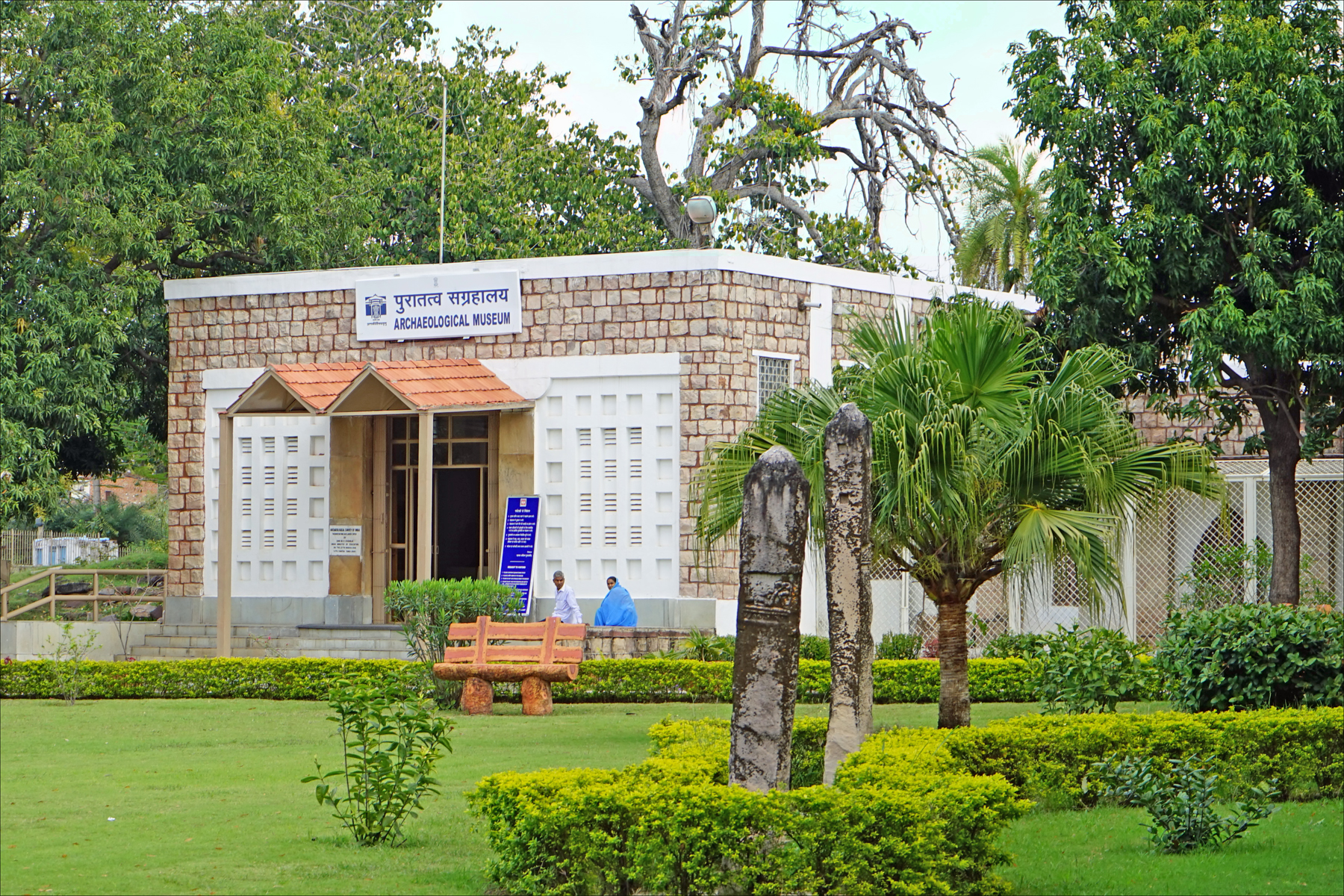
- Sanchi Archaeological Museum

- Sanchi Archaeological Museum
- Established: 1919
- Location: Sanchi Town, Madhya Pradesh, India, Asia
- Coordinates: 23°28′46″N 77°44′23″E
- Type: Archaeological
- Website: asi.nic.in/museum-sanchi

The Sanchi Archaeological Museum is a museum near the archaeological site of Sanchi. It houses various artifacts which were found in the nearby Buddhist complex. It was established in 1919, by John Marshall, the then director of the Archaeological Survey of India.

== Gallery ==
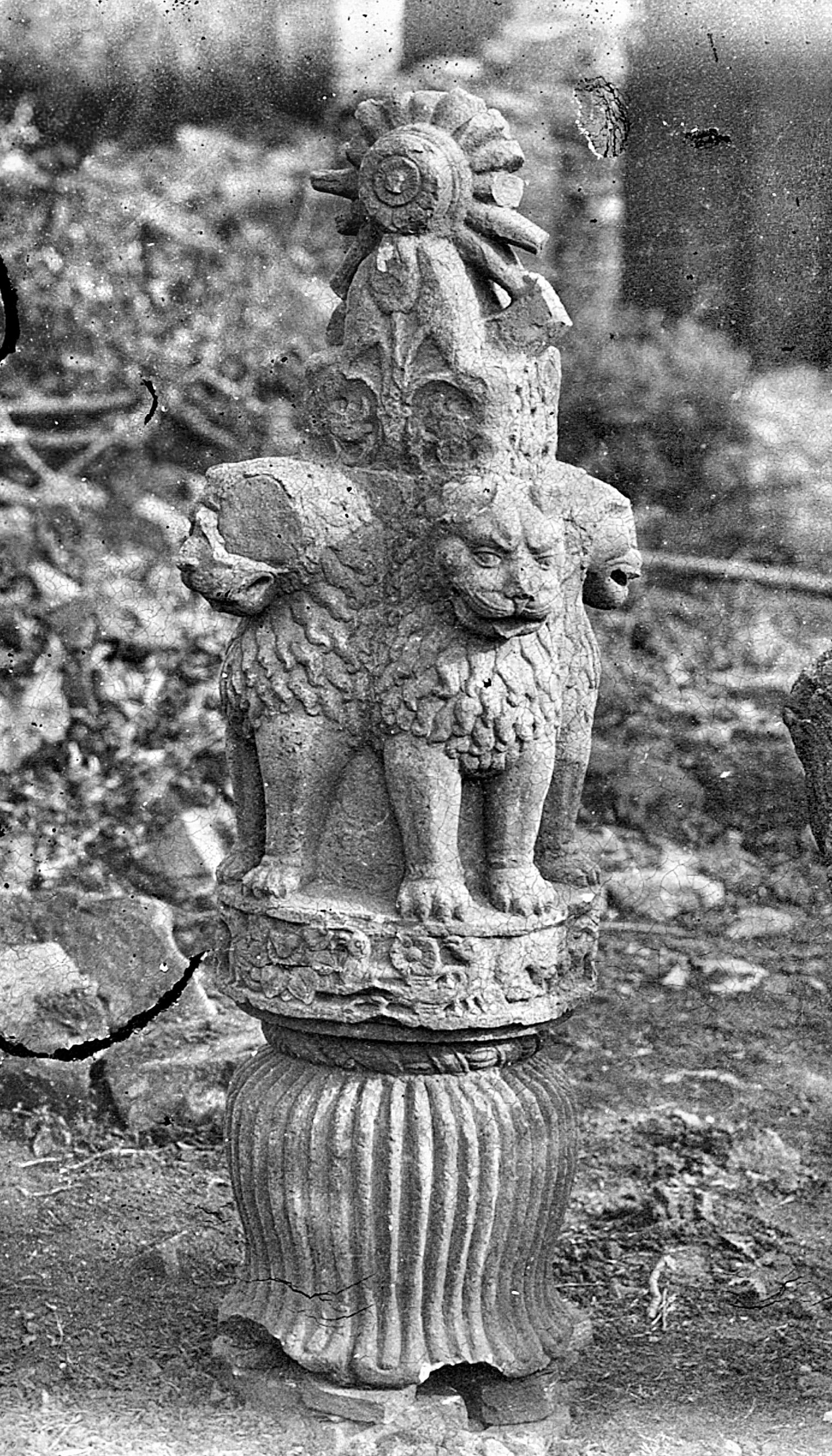
Remains of one of the Pillars of Ashoka, displayed at the museum.

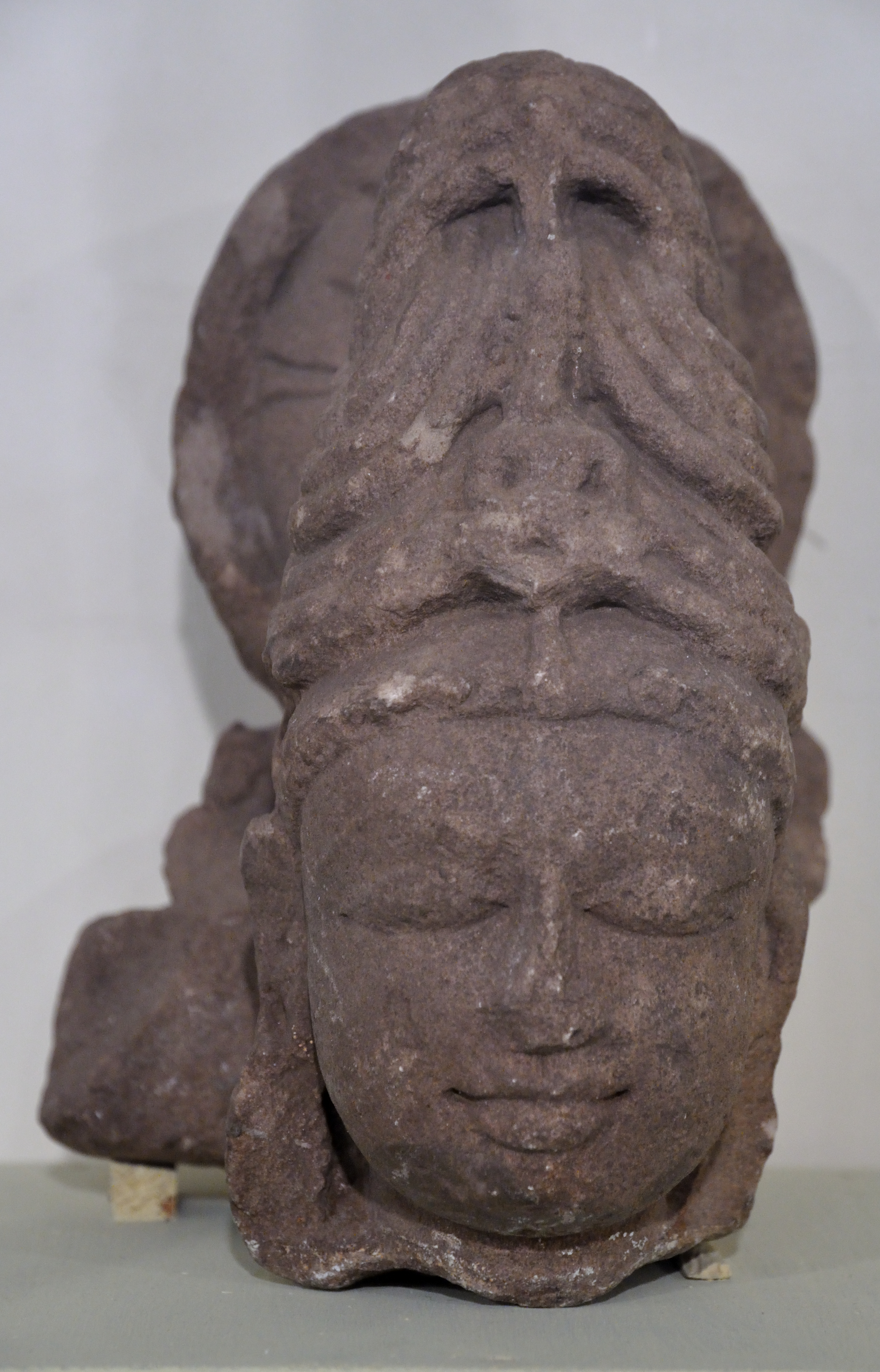
Avalokitesvara Head. Sandstone. Circa 12th Century CE.

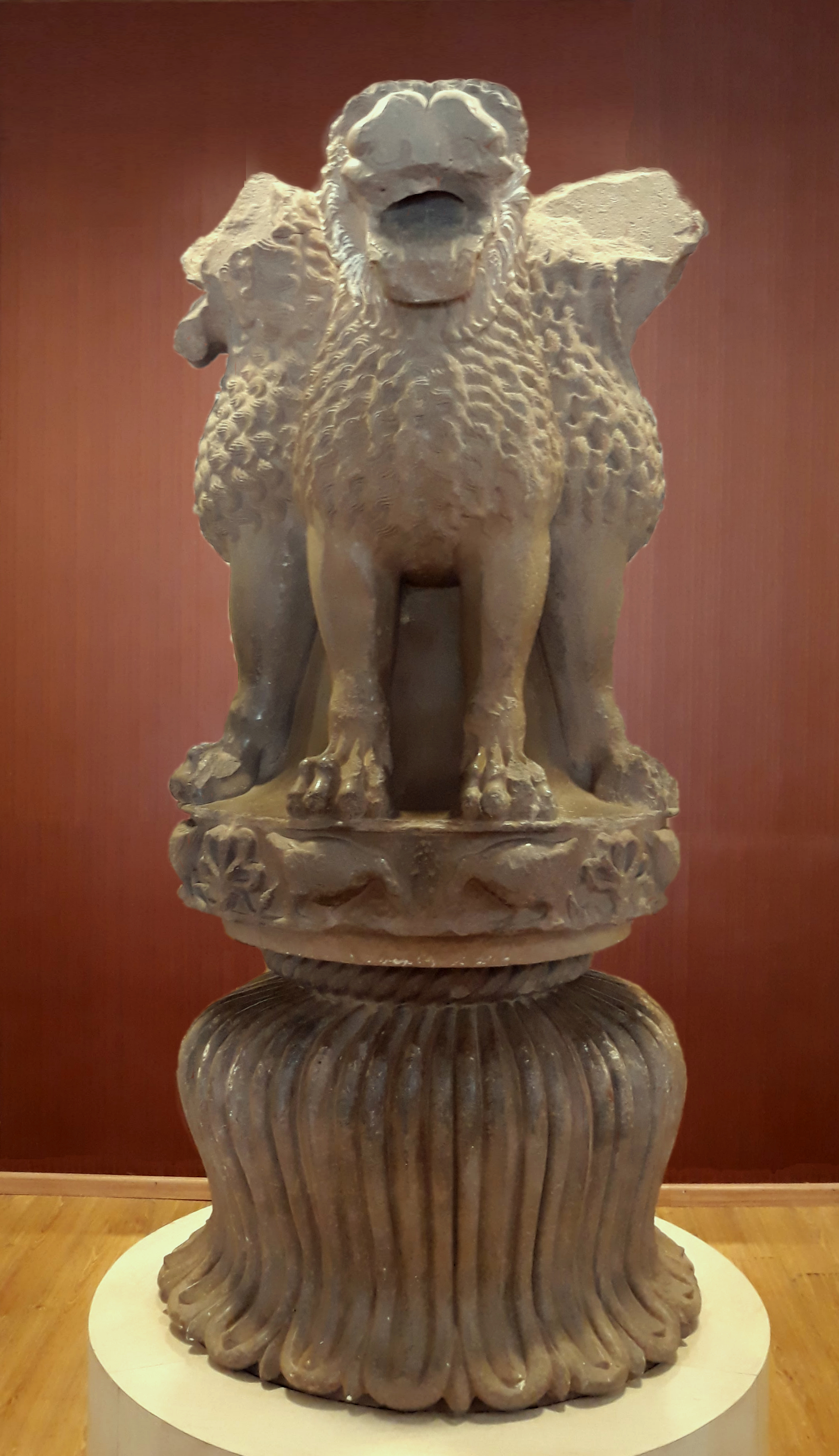
Sanchi capital of Ashoka.

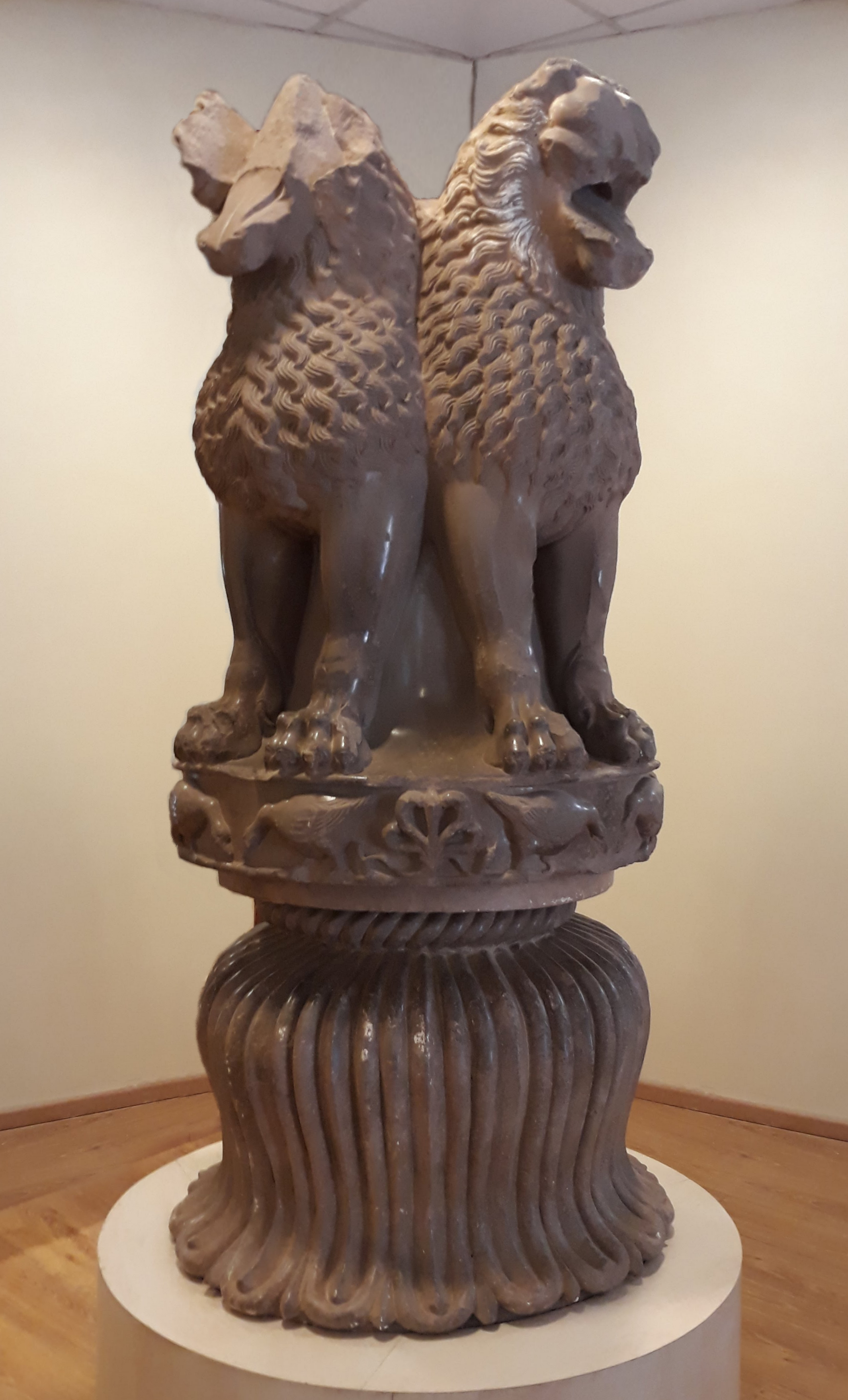
Sanchi capital of Ashokan pillar.

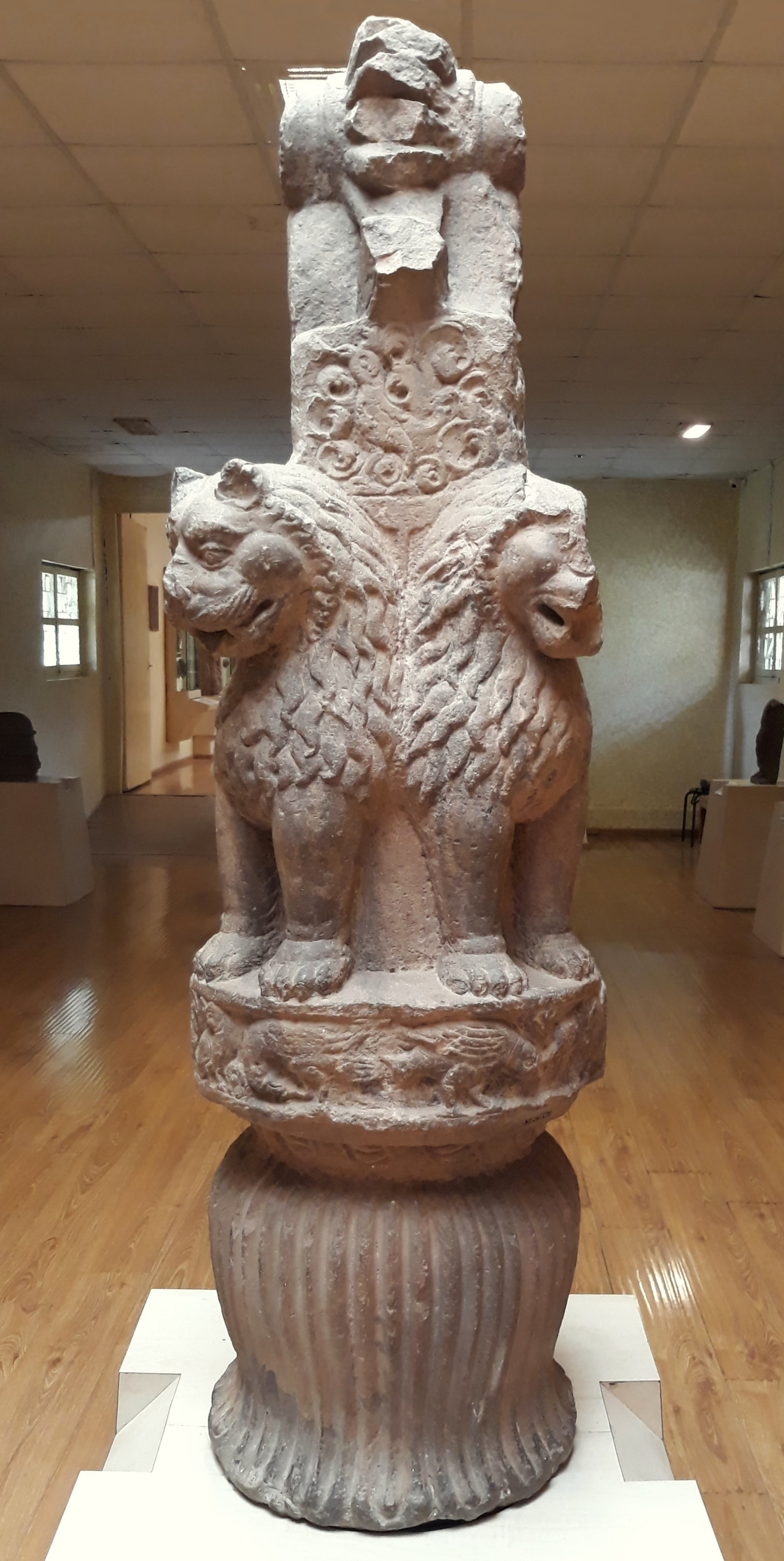
Gupta capital.

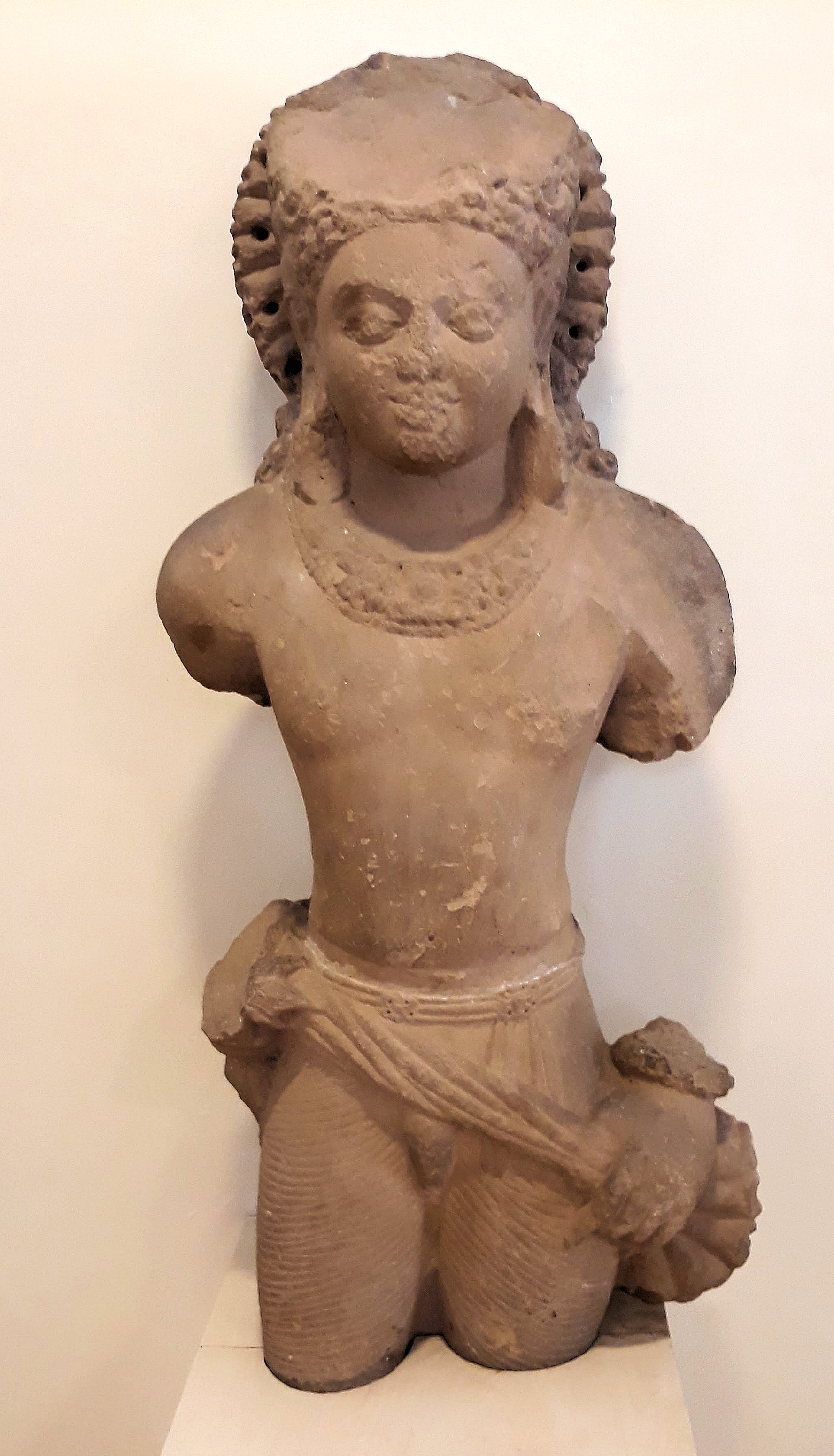
Sanchi Pillar 35 Vajrapani statue.

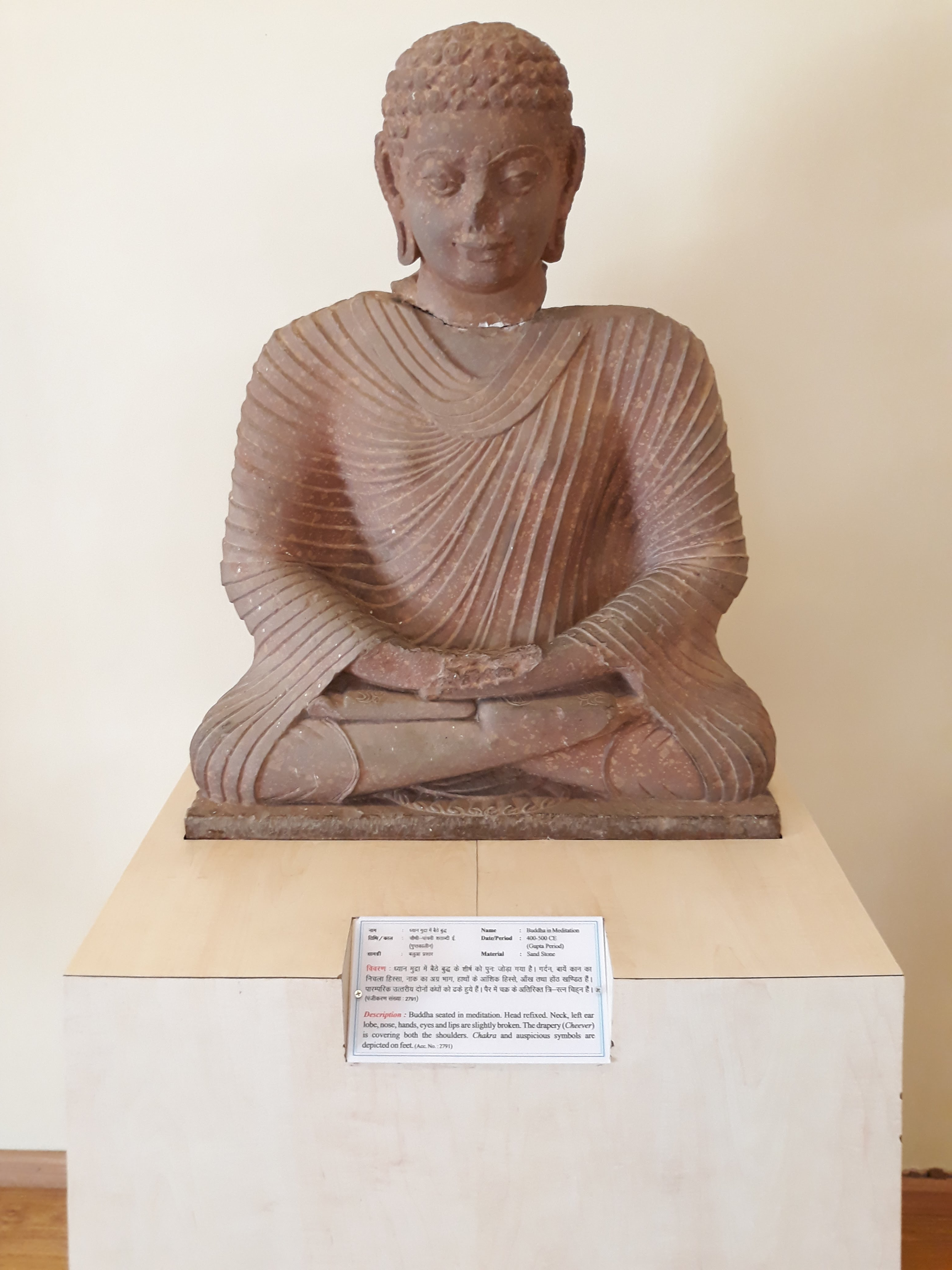
Buddha 400-500 CE.

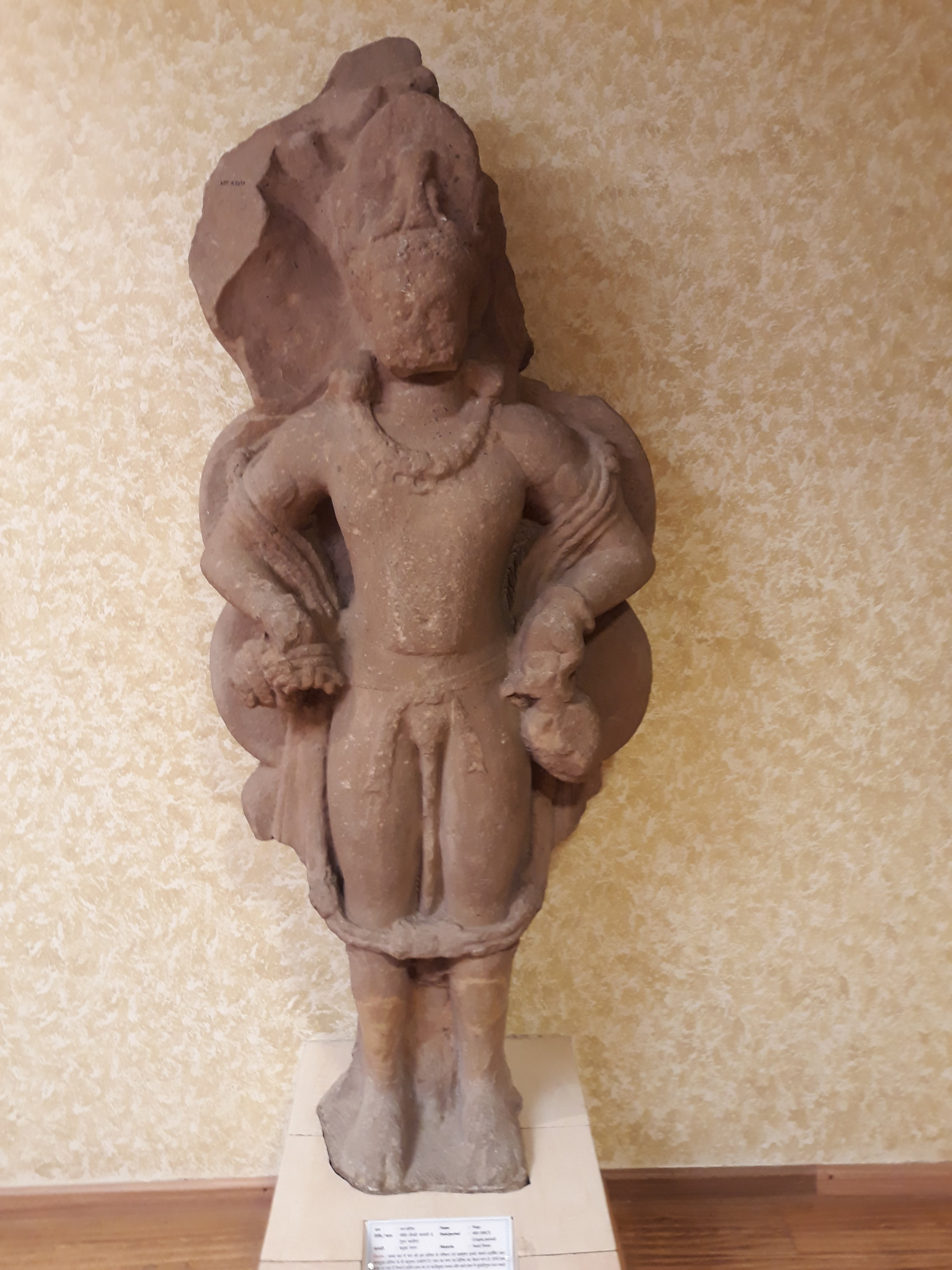
Naga in human form 400-500 CE.

== Sources ==
- Catalogue of the Sanchi Archaeological Museum (1922)
- Sanchi Museum Website with photo galleries
