= Kanakerha inscription =

Coordinates: 30.5180°N 77.8482°E

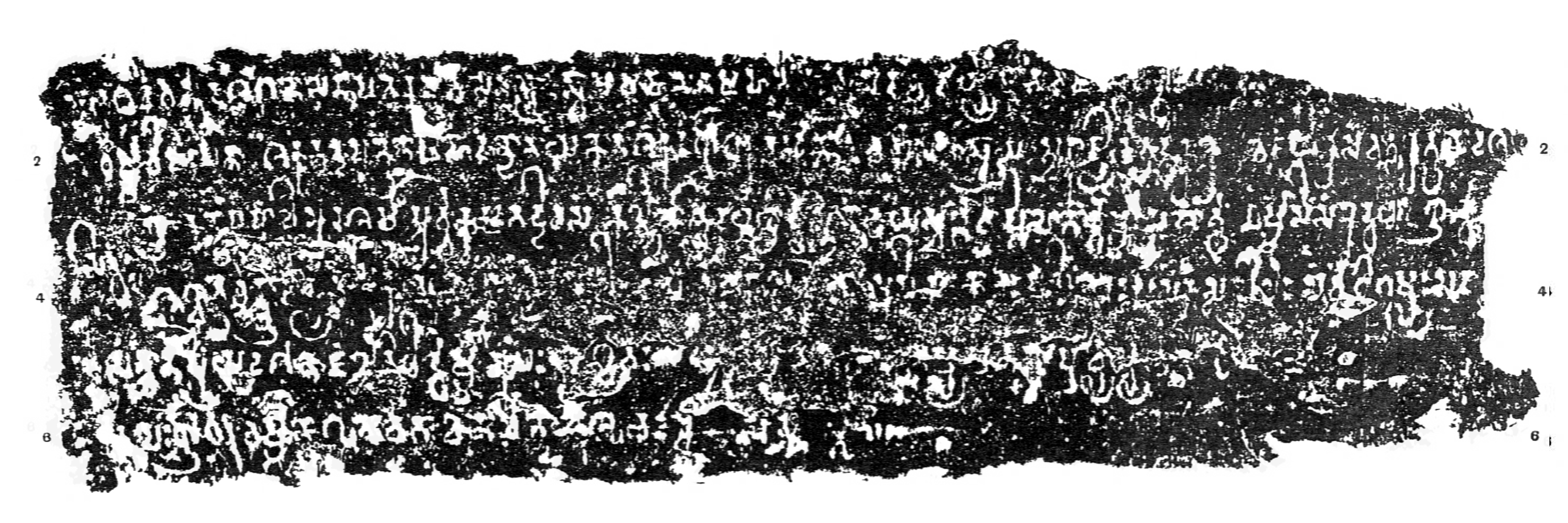
- The Kanakerha inscription.
- Material: Rock
- Writing: Sanskrit in the Brahmi script
- Created: 279 CE or 319 CE
- Period/culture: Western Satraps
- Discovered: Sanchi
- Present location: Sanchi Museum
- Sanchi (India)

The Kanakerha inscription, also spelled Kanakherha inscription, is an inscription found on the side of the hill of Sanchi, dating to the 3rd or 4th century CE.

The region of Sanchi-Vidisha was captured from the Satavahanas by the Western Satraps during the rule of Rudrasena II (255-278 CE), as shown by finds of his coinage in the area. The Western Satraps are then known to have remained in the area well into the 4th century, as shown by the Kanakherha inscription, on the hill of Sanchi.

The inscription mentions the construction of a well by the Saka (Gupta script:, Śaka) chief and "righteous conqueror" (dharmaviyagi mahadandanayaka) Sridharavarman (Gupta script:, Sridharavarmmana). Another inscription of the same Sridhavarman with his Naga military commander is known from Eran. At Eran, it seems that his inscription is succeeded by a monument and an inscription by Gupta Empire Samudragupta (r.336-380 CE), established "for the sake of augmenting his fame", who may therefore have ousted Sridharavarman in his campaigns to the West.

The inscription is in 6 lines, and bears a date of year 241 of the Saka era, the date of the record thus corresponding to 319 CE. Salomon gives an earlier date of 279 CE. It is written in mostly standard Sanskrit.

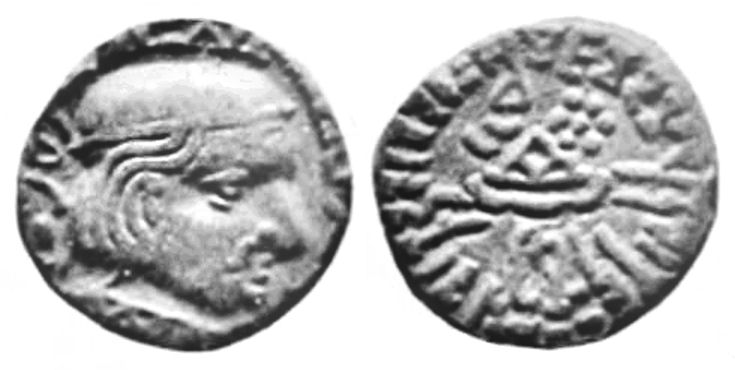
Rudrasimha II ruled the Western Satraps at the time of the Kanakerha inscription.

The object of the inscription is to record the excavation of a well by the Mahadandanayaka Saka Sridharavarmman, son of Saka Nanda. It refers itself to the 13th regnal year of Sridharavarmman, which shows that although styled as the general, he was enjoying the powers and privileges of an independent ruler. Evidently he belongs to one of those Western Satraps families that settled in Western India in the early centuries of the Christian era. He calls himself a dharma-vijayi, i.e. "the righteous conqueror" in line 2, and in line 3 there is reference to dharm-asi, i.e. "the sword of righteousness". In all likelihood Sridharavarmman originally served under some royal family, and later, throwing off the yoke, assumed the position of an independent ruler.

The inscription is currently in the Sanchi Museum, where it has the number A98.

Original Sanskrit and English translation of the Kanakerha inscription

- 1 Siddham Bhagavatas-tr[i]dasa-gana-senapater-ajita-senasya svami-Mahasena-maha[tejah-prasadat?] viryy-[ar]jj[i]ta-[vija]..........
- 2 dharmma-vijayina Śaka-Nanda-putrena Maha-danda-nayakena Śakena Sridharavarmmana var[shsha]-[saha]sraya sva-rajy-abhivriddhikare vejayike sarhvatsare trayodasa[me]
- 3 Sravana-bahulasya dasami-purvvakam-etad-divasarh kalyan-abhyudaya-vriddhy-artham-akshaya-svargg-avapti-hetor-ddharmma-yaso-rttharh dharmmasi-sarhbuddhayasraddha^ ....
- 4 sasvata-candr-aditya-kaliko-yam .......... i .... ma pi kayo ... h prasanna-salilah sarvv-adhigamyah sada
- 5 satvana[m] priya-darsano jalanidhir-ddharmm-amalah sasvatah ....... my ........... pracya ...........
- 6 [ku]pah Sridharavarmmana gunavata khanapito-yam subhah Sa[m] [200] 40 I

— Sanskrit text of the Kanakerha inscription.

- LI. 1-3. Success ! (Given) by the general, the Saka Sridharavarmman, son of the Saka Nanda, the righteous conqueror whose victory was won by his prowess .... (through the mighty power graciously bestowed on him by the god who is the commander of the heavenly forces and whose army is ever victorious, the lord Mahasena, in the thirteenth year of victory marked by the prosperity of his kingdom, on the tenth day of the dark half of Sravana, (to remain in force) for one thousand years.
- LI. 3-4. On this day, this (well was excavated) to last eternally, as long as the sun and the moon endure, for the increase of welfare and prosperity, and attainment of eternal (residence in) heaven, and for the sake of piety and fame, being actuated by a benevolent desire(?) awakened by the sword of righteousness.
- LI. 4-6. This auspicious well contains clear water and is always accessible to everybody, having an appearance pleasing to living beings. It is a perennial store-house of water, and is as pure as Dharma. It has been caused to be excavated by the meritorious Sridharavarmman. The (year) 241.

— English translation of the Kanakerha inscription.
