= Rudrasena II (Western Satrap) =

Third-century king in the Indian sub-continent

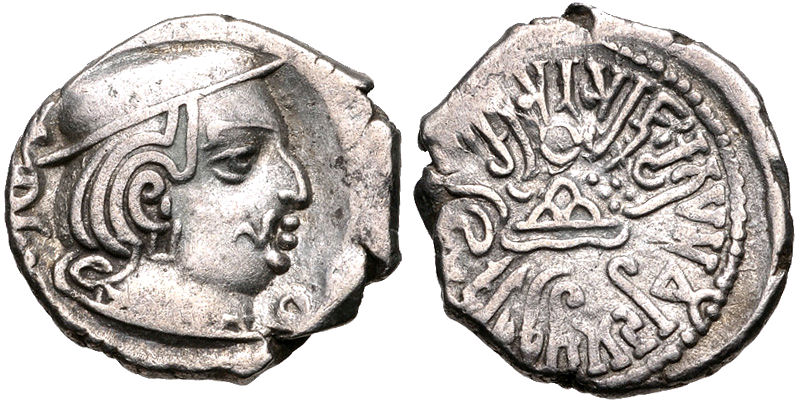
- Rudrasena II (256-278 CE). Head right, wearing close-fitting cap / Three-arched hill; group of five pellets to right.
- Reign: 256–278
- Predecessor: Damajadasri III
- Successor: Visvasimha
- Issue: Visvasimha Bhartrdaman
- House: Karadamka
- Father: Damajadasri I

Western Satrap territory extended from the west coast of India to Vidisha/ Sanchi and Eran, from the time of Rudrasena II (r. 256–278) well into the 4th century. Marital alliances with the Ikshvaku of southern India are mentioned in inscriptions at Nagarjunakonda (3rd century CE).

Rudrasena II (r. 256–278) was a king of the Western Satraps, and the 19th ruler of the Kshatrapa dynasty. The Kshatrapa dynasty seems to have reached a high level of prosperity under his rule.

The region of Sanchi-Vidisha was again captured from the Satavahanas during the rule of Rudrasena II, as shown by finds of his coinage in the area. The region had already been held once by the Western Satraps under Rudradaman (c. 130 CE).

After the conquest of Central India, Western Satraps are then known to have remained in the area well into the 4th century, as shown by the nearby Kanakerha inscription mentioning the construction of a well by the Saka chief and "righteous conqueror" Sridharavarman. They were also in control of the region of Eran, as shown by another inscription.

A marital alliance between the Andhra Ikshvaku and the Western Satraps seems to have occurred during the time of Rudrasena II, as the Andhra Ikshvaku ruler Māṭharīputra Vīrapuruṣadatta seems to have had as one of his wives Rudradhara-bhattarika, the "daughter of the ruler of Ujjain" (Uj(e)nika mahara(ja) balika), possibly king Rudrasena II.

The Western Satraps were finally ousted by Samudragupta (335-75) of the Gupta Empire.

== Sources ==
- K. Krishna Murthy (1977). Nāgārjunakoṇḍā: A Cultural Study. Concept. OCLC 4541213.
