= Chandragupta II =

Gupta emperor from c. 375 to c. 415

Chandragupta II 𑀘𑀦𑁆𑀤𑁆𑀭𑀕𑀼𑀧𑁆𑀢
- Vikramāditya (lit. 'The Sun of Valour'); Mahārājādhirāja (King of Kings)
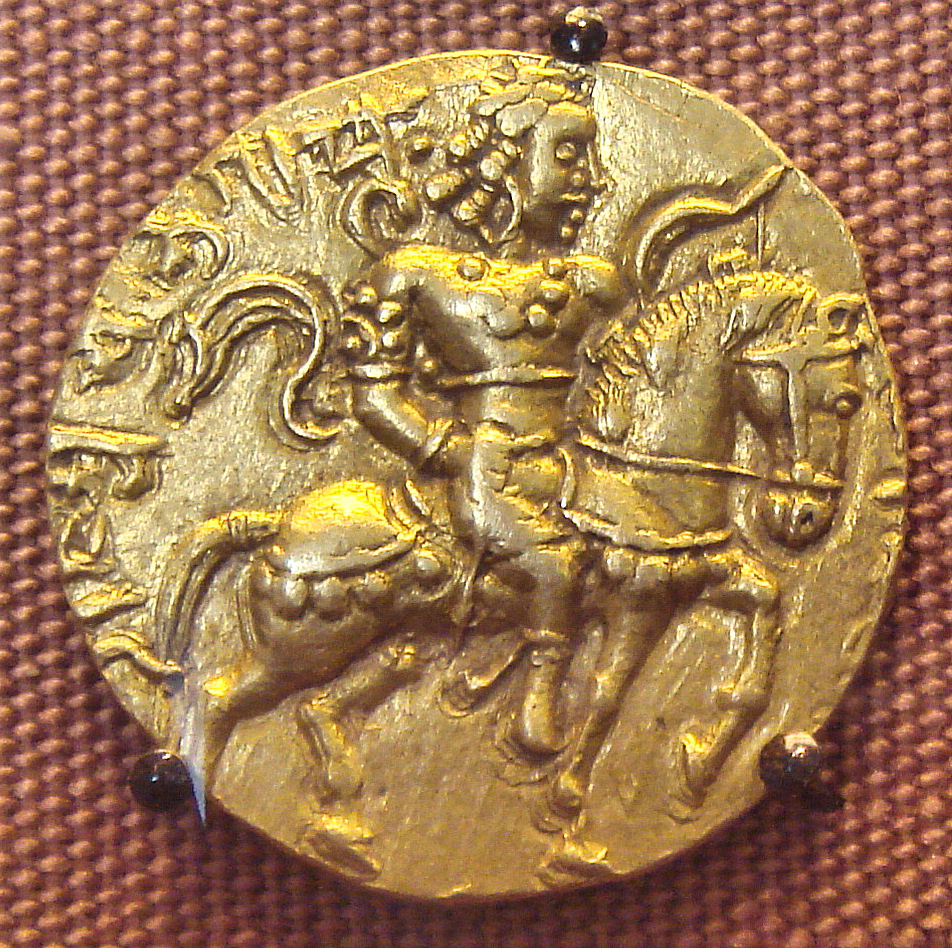
- An 8 gram gold coin featuring Chandragupta II astride a caparisoned horse, with a bow in his left hand. The name Cha-gu-pta appears in the upper left quadrant.

Gupta emperor
- Reign: c. 375 or 380 – c. 415
- Coronation: c. 380
- Predecessor: Samudragupta, possibly Ramagupta
- Successor: Kumaragupta I
- Born: (Unknown) possibly c. 345–350; Pataliputra, Gupta Empire
- Died: c. 415; Pataliputra or possibly Ujjain, Gupta Empire
- Spouse: Dhruvadevi, Kuberanaga
- Issue: Kumaragupta I; Prabhavatigupta; Govindagupta; Ghatotkachagupta
- Dynasty: Gupta
- Father: Samudragupta
- Mother: Dattadevi
- Religion: Hinduism
- Military career
- Allegiance: Gupta Empire
- Branch: Gupta Army
- Rank: Supreme Commander
- Conflicts: Gupta-Saka Wars

Chandragupta II (died c. 415), also known by his title Vikramaditya, as well as Chandragupta Vikramaditya, was the emperor of the Gupta Empire from c. 375 until his death in c. 415. Modern scholars generally identify him with King Chandra of the Delhi iron pillar inscription.

He continued the expansionist policy of his father Samudragupta through military conquests and marital alliances. Historical evidence attests to his remarkable victories, which include the defeat of the Sassanids, the conquest of the Western Kshatrapas and the vassalization of the Hunas. Under the reign of Chandragupta II, the Gupta Empire reached its zenith, directly controlling a vast territory which stretched from the Oxus River in the west to the Bengal region in the east, and from the foothills of the Himalayas in the north to the Narmada River in the south. Chandragupta II expanded his influence and indirectly ruled over the Kuntala region of Karnataka through a marriage alliance with Kadambas, and during his daughter Prabhavatigupta's 20-year-long regency, he effectively integrated the Vakataka dynasty into the Gupta Empire.

Short Sanskrit inscriptions Found at the Sacred Rock of Hunza in Gilgit-Baltistan mention both Chandra and Harisena. Here Chandra is generally identified as Famous Gupta emperor Chandragupta ІІ and Harisena is identified with Gupta Courtier and minister of his father Emperor Samudragupta. Harisena is not just a Simple poet. The Allahabad Prayaga Prashasti Pillar Identifies him as a Sandhavigrahika(minister of peace and war), Kumaramatya(Senior administrative official). This positions shows Harisena held senior administrative position and significant military power under Samudragupta and the Udayagiri Cave Inscriptions demonstrates that experienced ministers could accompany Chandragupta II on royal military expeditions.

Famous Historians such as R.C.Majumdar have explored the possibility and pointed out that the combination of Chandra,Vikramaditya, and mention of Samudragupta's courtier Harisena on the Sacred Rocks of Hunza in Gilgit-Balitstan of Kashmir validates the claim mentioned in the Mehrauli Iron Pillar in Delhi claiming "Chandra" referring to "Chandragupta II Crossing Seven Mouths Of Indus to conquer the Vahlikas". Here the Vahlikas are commonly associated with Bactrian Region Around Balkh in present-day Afghanistan, Although the geographical identification remains debated. This validates the possibility of Military Expedition conducted by Chandragupta II crossing Indus River and defeating the Vahlikas as claimed in the Chandragupta's Mehrauli Iron Pillar.

Chandragupta II was a devout Vaishnava but tolerated other faiths as well. He was a great patron of learning, and his court is said to have hosted a group of nine scholars known as the Navaratnas (nine gems). His rule strengthened trade, culture, and administration, making him one of India's most celebrated monarchs. The Chinese pilgrim Faxian, who visited India during his reign, suggests that he ruled over a peaceful and prosperous kingdom. The legendary figure of Vikramaditya is probably based on Chandragupta II (among other kings), and the noted Sanskrit poet Kalidasa may have been his court poet. The cave shrines at Udayagiri were also built during his rule. He was succeeded by Kumaragupta I.

== Names and titles ==
"Chandra" inscriptions
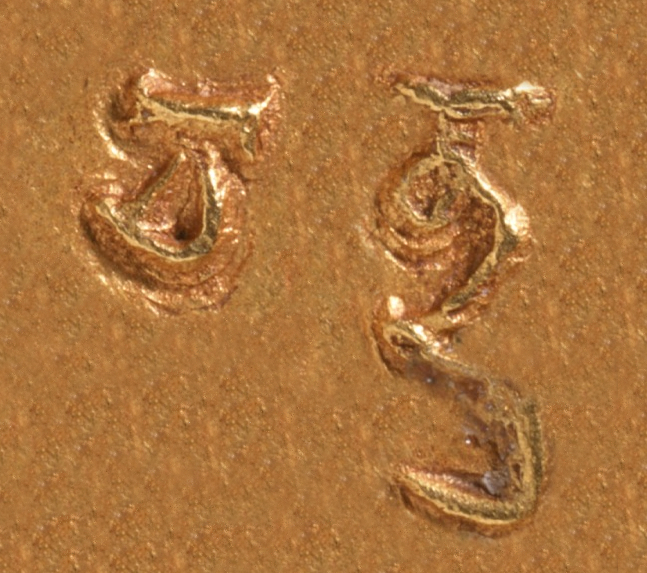
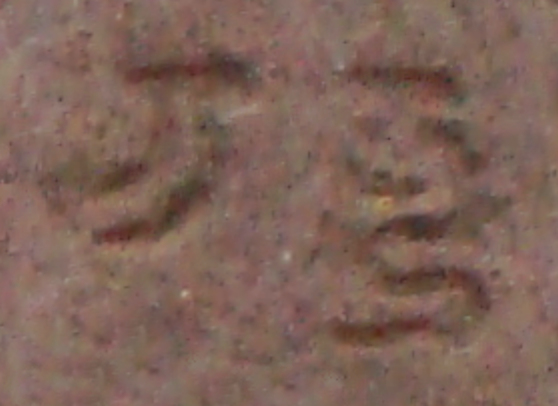
The name "Chandra" on a coin of Chandragupta II (left), and on the Iron Pillar of Delhi (right). Gupta script: letter "Cha", followed by the conjunct consonant "ndra" formed of the vertical combination of the three letters n d and r.

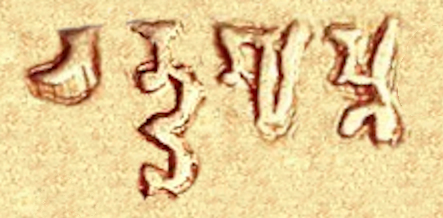
The full name "Chandragupta" in Gupta script (Gupta script:) Cha-ndra-gu-pta, on coinage.

Chandragupta II was the second ruler of the dynasty to bear the name "Chandragupta", the first being his grandfather Chandragupta I. He was also simply known as "Chandra", as attested by his coins. The Sanchi inscription of his officer Amrakardava states that he was also known as Deva-raja. The records of his daughter Prabhavatigupta, issued as a Vakataka queen, call him Chandragupta as well as Deva-gupta. Deva-shri (IAST: Devaśri) is another variation of this name. The Delhi iron pillar inscription states that king Chandra was also known as "Dhava": if this king Chandra is identified with Chandragupta (see below), it appears that "Dhava" was another name for the king. Another possibility is that "dhava" is a mistake for a common noun "bhava", although this is unlikely, as the rest of the inscription does not contain any errors.

A passage in the Vishnu Purana suggests that major parts of the eastern coast of India – Kosala, Odra, Tamralipta, and Puri – were ruled by the Devarakshitas around the same time as the Guptas. Since it seems unlikely that an obscure dynasty named Devarakshita was powerful enough to control substantial territory during the Gupta period, some scholars, such as Dasharatha Sharma, theorize that "Deva-rakshita" (IAST: Devarakṣita) was another name for Chandragupta II. Others, such as D. K. Ganguly, oppose this theory, arguing that this identification is quite arbitrary, and cannot be explained satisfactorily.

Chandragupta assumed the titles Bhattaraka and Maharajadhiraja, and bore the epithet Apratiratha ("having no equal or antagonist"). The Supiya stone pillar inscription, issued during the reign of his descendant Skandagupta, also calls him "Vikramaditya". Some other notable titles such as "Lord of the Three Oceans" and "Ascetic King" (rājādhirājaṛṣi) are also accoladed to Chandragupta II.

== Early life ==
Chandragupta was a son of Samudragupta and queen Dattadevi, as attested by his own inscriptions. According to the official Gupta genealogy, Chandragupta succeeded his father on the Gupta throne. The Sanskrit play Devichandraguptam, combined with other evidence suggests that he had an elder brother named Ramagupta, who preceded him on the throne. In the play, Ramagupta decides to surrender his queen Dhruvadevi to a Shaka enemy when besieged, but Chandragupta goes to the enemy camp disguised as the queen and kills the enemy. Sometime later, Chandragupta dethrones Ramagupta, and becomes the new king. The historicity of this narrative is debated among modern historians, with some believing it to be based on true historical events, while others dismissing it as a work of fiction.

== Period of reign ==
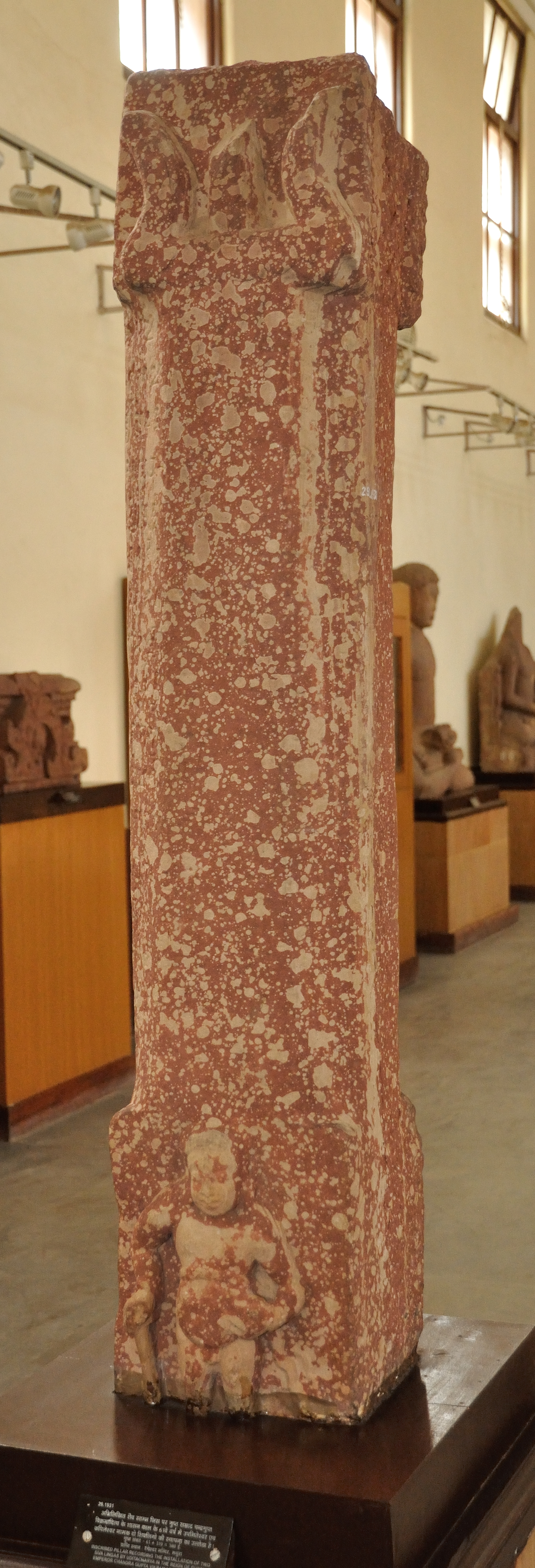
The pillar inscribed with the Lakulisa Mathura Pillar Inscription, Mathura recording the installation of two Shiva Lingas by Udita Acharya in the "year 61 following the era of the Guptas in the reign of Chandragupta Vikramaditya, son of Samudragupta" (380 CE). Rangeshwar Temple. Mathura Museum. Mathura Museum.

The Mathura pillar inscription of Chandragupta II (as well as some other Gupta inscriptions) mention two dates: several historians have assumed that one of these dates denotes the king's regnal year, while the other date denotes the year of the Gupta calendar era. However, Indologist Harry Falk in 2004 has theorised that the date understood to be the regnal year by the earlier scholars is actually a date of the kālānuvarttamāna system. According to Falk, the kālānuvarttamāna system is a continuation of the Kushana calendar era established by emperor Kanishka, whose coronation Falk dates to 127 CE. The Kushana era restarts counting after a hundred years (e.g. the year after 100 is 1, not 101).

The date portion of the Mathura inscription reads (in IAST):

candragupta-sya vijarajya-saṃvatsa[re] ... kālānuvarttamāna-saṃvatsare ekaṣaṣṭhe 60 ... [pra]thame śukla-divase paṃcāmyaṃ

The letters before the words kālānuvarttamāna-saṃvatsare are abraded in the inscription, but historian D. R. Bhandarkar (1931–1932) reconstructed them as gupta, and translated the term gupta-kālānuvarttamāna-saṃvatsare as "year following the Gupta era". He translated the entire sentence as:

In the ... year of ... Chandragupta, ... on the fifth of the bright half of the first (Ashadha) of the year 61 following the Gupta era.

Historian D. C. Sircar (1942) restored the missing letters as "[paṃ]cāme" ("fifth") and concluded that the inscription was dated to the Chandragupta's fifth regnal year. The missing letters have alternatively been read as "prathame" ("first"). According to these interpretations, the inscription is thus dated in year 61 of the Gupta era, and either the first or the fifth regnal year of Chandragupta. Assuming that the Gupta era starts around 319–320 CE, the beginning of Chandragupta's reign can be dated to either 376–377 CE or 380–381 CE.

Falk agrees that the missing letters denote a numerical year, but dismisses Sircar's reading as "mere imagination", pointing out that the missing letters are "abraded beyond recovery". In support of his Kushana era theory, Falk presents four Gupta inscriptions (in chronological order) that mention the term kālānuvarttamāna-saṃvatsare:

Inscription	Reigning monarch	Dynastic year	kālānuvarttamāna year
Mathura pillar	Chandragupta II	Abraded	61
Lintel	Not mentioned	Not given	70
Yaksha figure	Kumaragupta I	112	5
Buddhist image pedestal	Kumaragupta I	121	15

Falk notes that the "dynastic year" in the table above appears to be a year of the Gupta era. The kālānuvarttamāna year cannot be regnal year, because Chandragupta I is not known to have ruled for as long as 61 years. If we assume "61" of the Mathura pillar inscription denotes a year of the Gupta era (as assumed by Bhandarkar, Sircar and other scholars), we must assume that "15" of the Buddhist image pedestal also denotes a year of the Gupta era: this is obviously incorrect, since Kumaragupta I ruled after Chandragupta II. Scholars K.K. Thaplyal and R.C. Sharma, who studied the Buddhist image pedestal inscription, speculated that the scribe had mistakenly interchanged the years 121 and 15, but Falk calls this assumption unnecessary.

According to Falk, the discrepancy can be explained satisfactorily, if we assume that the kālānuvarttamāna era denotes a system that restarts counting after a hundred years. The Yaksha figure inscription is dated to year 112 of the Gupta era (c. 432 CE), which corresponds to the kālānuvarttamāna year 5. Thus, the kālānuvarttamāna era used during Kumaragupta's time must have started in 432–5 = 427 CE. The years mentioned in the Buddhist image pedestal inscription also suggests that the epoch of this era was c. 426–427 CE. Since the kālānuvarttamāna system restarts counting every 100 years, the kālānuvarttamāna era used during the reign of Chandragupta II must have started in 327 CE. Thus, the Mathura inscription can be dated to 327+61 = c. 388 CE. While Falk's theory does not change the Gupta chronology significantly, it implies that the date of the Mathura inscription cannot be used to determine the beginning of Chandragupta's reign.

The Sanchi inscription, dated to 412–413 CE (year 93 of the Gupta era), is the last known dated inscription of Chandragupta. His son Kumaragupta was on the throne by the 415–416 CE (year 96 of the Gupta era), so Chandragupta's reign must have ended sometime during 412–415 CE.

== Military career ==
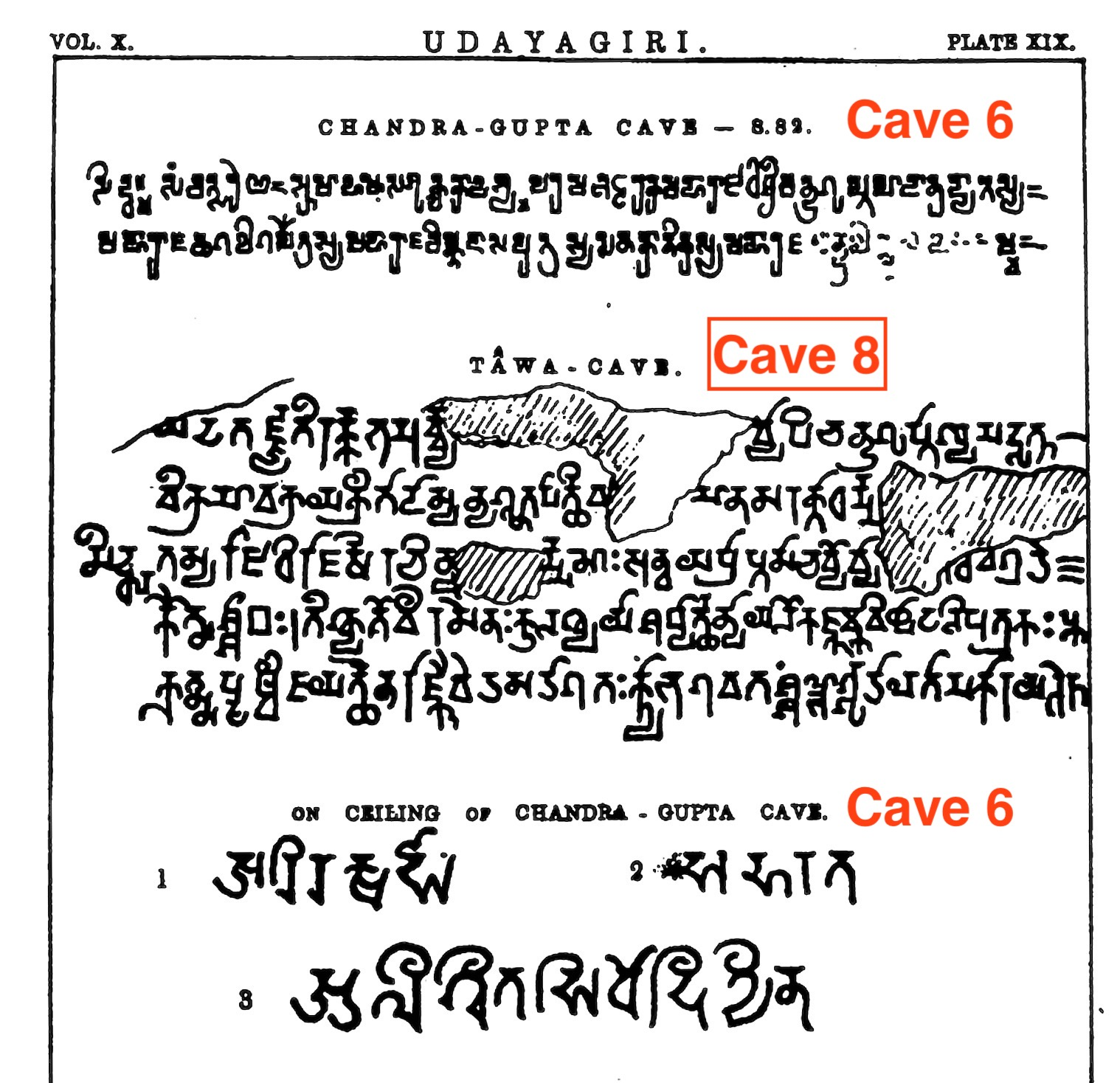
Cave 6 and Cave 8 inscriptions at Udayagiri Caves mention the rule of Chandragupta II.

The Udayagiri inscription of Chandragupta's foreign minister Virasena suggests that the king had a distinguished military career. It states that he "bought the earth", paying for it with his prowess, and reduced the other kings to the status of slaves. His empire seems to have extended from the mouth of the Indus and northern Pakistan in the west to the Bengal region in the east, and from the Himalayan foothills in the north to the Narmada River in the south.

Chandragupta's father Samudragupta and his son Kumaragupta I are known to have performed the Ashvamedha horse sacrifice to proclaim their military prowess. In the 20th century, the discovery of a stone image of a horse found near Varanasi, and the misreading of its inscription as "Chandramgu" (taken to be "Chandragupta"), led to speculation that Chandragupta also performed the Ashvamedha sacrifice. However, there is no actual evidence to support this theory.

=== Western Kshatrapas ===
Historical and literary evidence suggests that Chandragupta II achieved military successes against the Western Kshatrapas (also known as Shakas), who ruled in west-central India. The Allahabad Pillar inscription of Chandragupta's father Samudragupta names the "Shaka-Murundas" among the kings who tried to appease him. It may be possible that Samudragupta reduced the Shakas to a state of subordinate alliance, and Chandragupta completely subjugated them.

Virasena's Udayagiri inscription describes him as a resident of Pataliputra, and states that he came to Udayagiri in Central India with the king who sought to "conquer the whole world". This indicates that Chandragupta had reached Udayagiri in central India during a military campaign. The theory that Chandragupta led an army to Central India is also corroborated by the c. 412–413 CE (Gupta year 93) Sanchi inscription of Amrakardava, who is said to have "acquired victory and fame in many battles and whose livelihood was secured by serving Chandragupta." A c. 401–402 CE (Gupta year 82) inscription of Chandragupta's feudatory Maharaja Sanakanika has also been discovered in Central India. The only important power to have ruled in this region during Chandragupta's period were the Western Kshatrapas, whose rule is attested by their distinct coinage. The coins issued by the Western Kshatrapa rulers abruptly come to end in the last decade of the 4th century. The coins of this type reappear in the second decade of the 5th century, and are dated in the Gupta era, which suggests that Chandragupta subjugated the Western Kshatrapas.

The exact date of Chandragupta's victory is not known, but it can be tentatively dated to sometime between 397 and 409. The last of the 4th century Kshatrapa coins – that of Rudrasimha III – can be dated to the Shaka year 310 or 319 (the coin legend is partially lost), that is 388 or 397. Chandragupta's coins, dated to 409, are similar to the Kshtrapa coins, with the Shakas' Buddhist vihara symbol replaced by the Gupta symbol of Garuda.

Literary evidence also corroborates Chandragupta's victory over the Western Kshatrapas. The Sanskrit play Devichandraguptam, whose historicity is disputed, narrates that Chandragupta's elder brother Ramagupta agreed to surrender his queen Dhruvadevi to a Shaka chief when besieged, but Chandragupta went to the enemy camp disguised as the queen, and killed the Shaka chief. Chandragupta bore the title Vikramaditya, and several Indian legends talk of king Vikramaditya who defeated the Shakas. Several modern scholars have theorised that these legends may be based on Chandragupta's victory over the Shakas.

As a result of his victory over the Western Kshatrapas, Chandragupta must have extended his empire up to the Arabian Sea coast in present-day Gujarat.

=== Other military campaigns ===
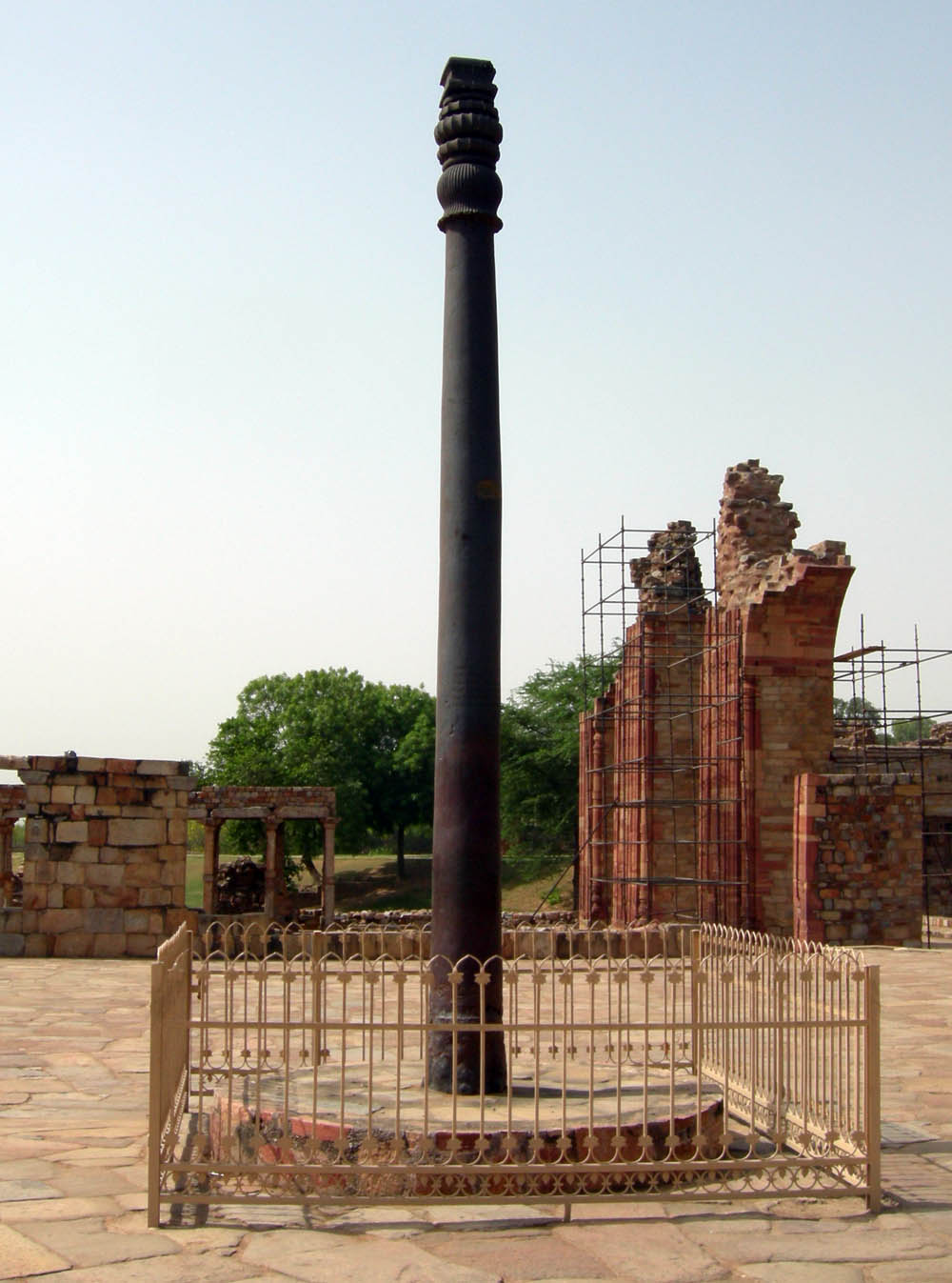
The iron pillar of Delhi, which features an inscription of king Chandra, identified as Chandragupta II. It was installed as a victory pillar in the Qutb complex by Sultan Iltutmish in the 13th century.

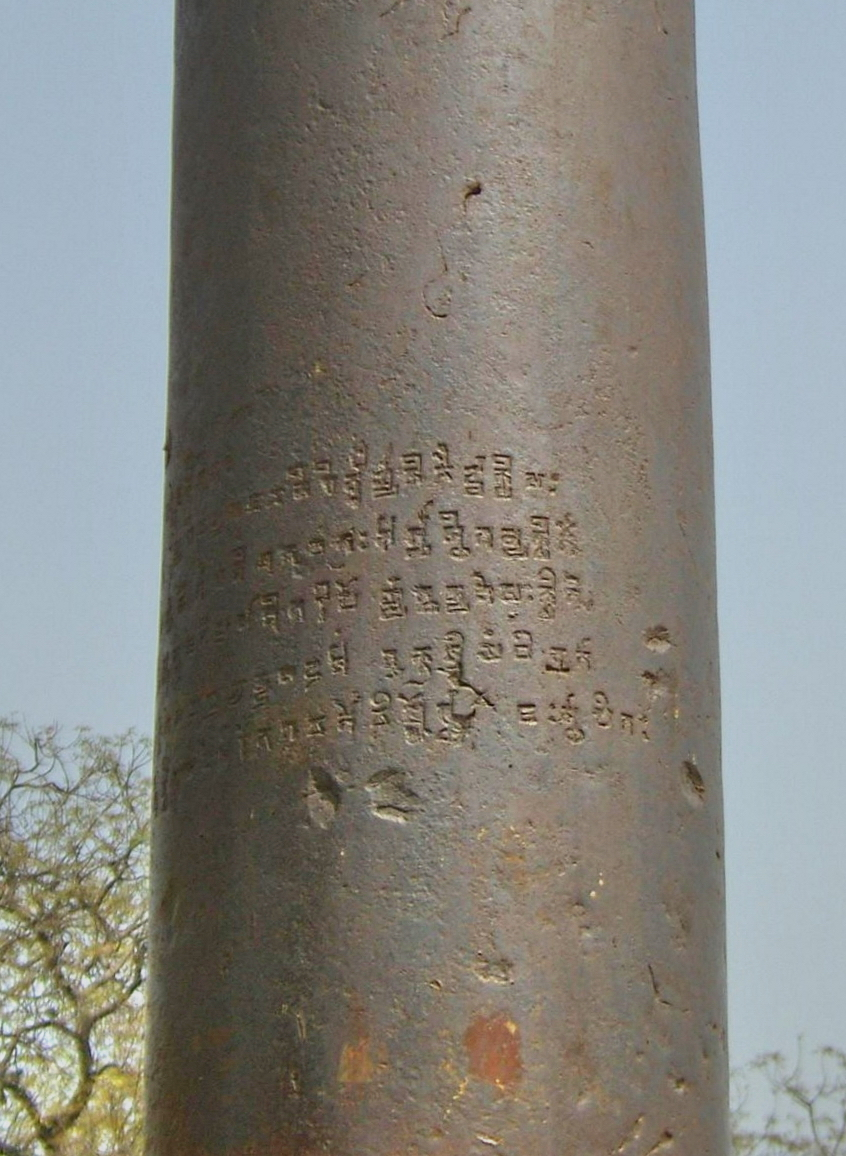
The inscription of king Chandra

The iron pillar of Delhi contains an inscription of a king called "Chandra". Modern scholars generally identify this king with Chandragupta II, although this cannot be said with complete certainty.

While alternative identifications have been proposed, there is strong evidence for identifying Chandra of the iron pillar inscription as Chandragupta II:

- Chandragupta's coins refer to him as "Chandra".
- According to the iron pillar inscription, Chandra was a devotee of Vishnu. Chandragupta was also a Vaishnavite, and is described as a Bhagvata (devotee of Vishnu) in the Gupta records.
- The iron pillar is said to have been set up by king Chandra in honour of Vishnu, on a hill named Vishnu-pada, but the king seems to have died shortly before the inscription was engraved, as the inscription states that "the king has quit the earth and gone to the other world". A similar Vishnu-dhvaja (flagpole in honour of Vishnu) was set up the Gupta emperor Skandagupta (a grandson of Chandragupta) after the death of his father Kumaragupta I.
- According to his Udayagiri inscription, Chandragupta went on a digvijaya ("conquest of all quarters") campaign. He is known to have been a powerful sovereign emperor, and this fits in well with the iron pillar inscription's description of king Chandra as someone who "attained sole supreme sovereignty in the world acquired by his own arm and (enjoyed) for a very long time".
- The iron pillar inscription states that the southern ocean is "perfumed by the breezes" of Chandra's prowess. This may be a reference to Chandragupta's extension of the Gupta rule to the Arabian Sea after his conquest of the Western Kshatrapa territory. Arabian Sea was located to the south of the Gupta Empire, and thus, the term "southern ocean" is applicable to it in this context.
- The iron pillar inscription states that "his name was Chandra and he was holding the glory of a full moon on his face". This is reminiscent of his descendant Skandagupta's Mandasaur inscription, which describes Chandragupta as "a moon in the galaxy of Gupta kings with the famous name Chandragupta".

The iron pillar inscription credits Chandra with the following victories:

- Defeated an alliance of enemies in the Vanga country
- Crossed the "seven faces" of the river Sindhu (Indus) during a war and defeated the Vahlikas.

==== Punjab and Balkh ====
If Chandra is identified with Chandragupta, it appears that Chandragupta marched through the Punjab region, and advanced up to the country of the Vahlikas, that is, Balkh in present-day Afghanistan.

According to Sten Konow, the term "seven faces", mentioned in the iron pillar inscription, refers to the seven mouths of Indus. Historians R. C. Majumdar and K. P. Jayaswal, on the other hand, believe that the term refers to the tributaries of Indus: the five rivers of Punjab (Jhelum, Ravi, Sutlej, Beas, and Chenab), plus possibly the Kabul and the Kunar rivers.

It is quite possible that Chandragupta passed through the Punjab region during this campaign: his political influence in this region is attested to by the use of the Gupta era in an inscription found at Shorkot, and by some coins bearing the name "Chandragupta". However, there is no evidence that Chandragupta annexed Punjab to the Gupta Empire, which suggests that Chandragupta's victory in this region was not a decisive one. There is little evidence of Gupta influence in Punjab after his reign: numismatic evidence suggests that Punjab was ruled by petty chieftains after his death. These chieftains bore Indian names, but issued coins that imitate the Kidarite coinage: they may have been Hinduized foreigners or Indians continuing the usage of foreign-style coinage.

==== Gilgit-Baltistan (Kashmir) ====
Some short Sanskrit inscriptions at the Sacred Rock of Hunza (in present-day Pakistan), written in Gupta script, mention the name Chandra. A few of these inscriptions also mention the name Harishena, and one particular inscription mentions Chandra with the epithet "Vikramaditya". Based on the identification of "Chandra" with Chandragupta, and Harishena with the Gupta courtier Harishena, these inscriptions can be considered as further evidence of a Gupta military campaign in the area.

==== Bengal region ====
The identification of Chandra with Chandragupta II also suggests Chandragupta achieved victories in the Vanga area in the present-day Bengal region. According to the Allahabad Pillar inscription of his father Samudragupta, the Samatata kingdom of the Bengal region was a Gupta tributary. The Guptas are known to have been ruling Bengal in the early 6th century, although there are no surviving records of the Gupta presence in this region for the intervening period.

It is possible that a large part of the Bengal region was annexed to the Gupta Empire by Chandragupta, and that this control continued into the 6th century. The Delhi iron pillar inscription suggests that an alliance of semi-independent chiefs of Bengal unsuccessfully resisted Chandragupta's attempts to extend the Gupta influence in this region.

== Personal life and matrimonial alliances ==
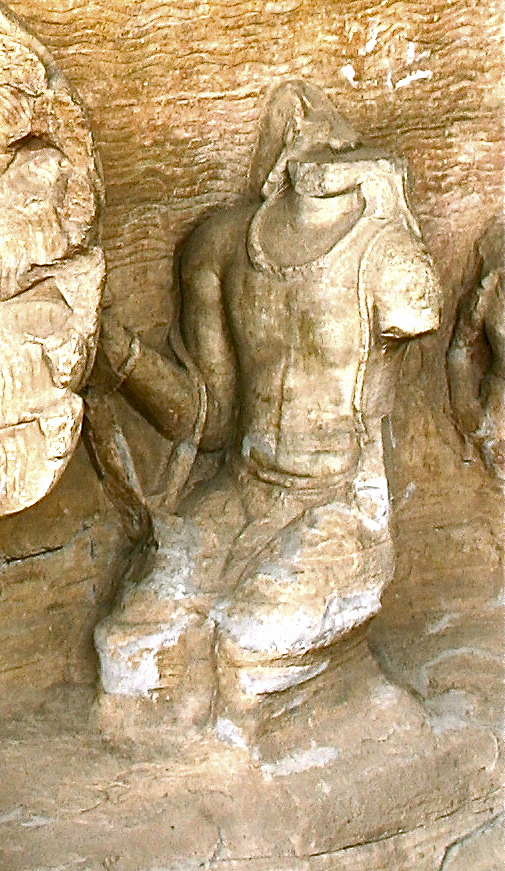
Probable image of Chandragupta II, paying homage to Varaha, avatar of Vishnu, in Udayagiri Caves, circa 400.

Gupta records mention Dhruvadevi as Chandragupta's queen, and the mother of his successor Kumaragupta I. The Basarh clay seal mentions Dhruva-svamini as a queen of Chandragupta, and the mother of Govindagupta. It is unlikely that Chandragupta had two different queens with similar names: it appears that Dhruvasvamini was most probably another name for Dhruvadevi, and that Govindagupta was a real brother of Kumaragupta.

Chandragupta also married Kuvera-naga (alias Kuberanaga), whose name indicates that she was a princess of the Naga dynasty, which held considerable power in central India before Samudragupta subjugated them. This matrimonial alliance may have helped Chandragupta consolidate the Gupta Empire, and the Nagas may have helped him in his war against the Western Kshatrapas.

Prabhavatigupta, the daughter of Chandragupta and Kuvera-naga, married the Vakataka king Rudrasena II, who ruled in the Deccan region to the south of the Gupta Empire. After her husband's death in c. 390, Prabhavatigupta acted as a regent for her minor sons. In the two copper-plate inscriptions issued during her regency, the names of her Gupta ancestors with their imperial titles appear before the name of the Vakataka king with the lesser title Maharaja. This suggests that the Gupta court may have had influence in the Vakataka administration during her regency. Historians Hermann Kulke and Dietmar Rothermund believe that the Vakataka kingdom was "practically a part of the Gupta empire" during her 20-year long regency. The Vakatakas may have supported Chandragupta during his conflict with the Western Kshatrapas.

The Guptas also appear to have entered into a matrimonial alliance with the Kadamba dynasty, the southern neighbours of the Vakatakas. The Talagunda pillar inscription suggests that the daughters of the Kadamba king Kakusthavarman, married into other royal families, including that of the Guptas. While Kakusthavarman was a contemporary of Chandragupta's son Kumaragupta I, it is noteworthy that some medieval chiefs of present-day Karnataka (where the Kadambas ruled) claimed descent from Chandragupta. According to the Vikramaditya legends, emperor Vikramaditya (a character believed to be based on Chandragupta) sent his court poet Kalidasa as an ambassador to the lord of Kuntala. While the Kuntala king referred to in this legend has been identified by some scholars with a Vakataka king, it is more likely that he was a Kadamba king, because the Vakataka king did not rule over Kuntala, and was never called the lord of Kuntala.

== Administration ==
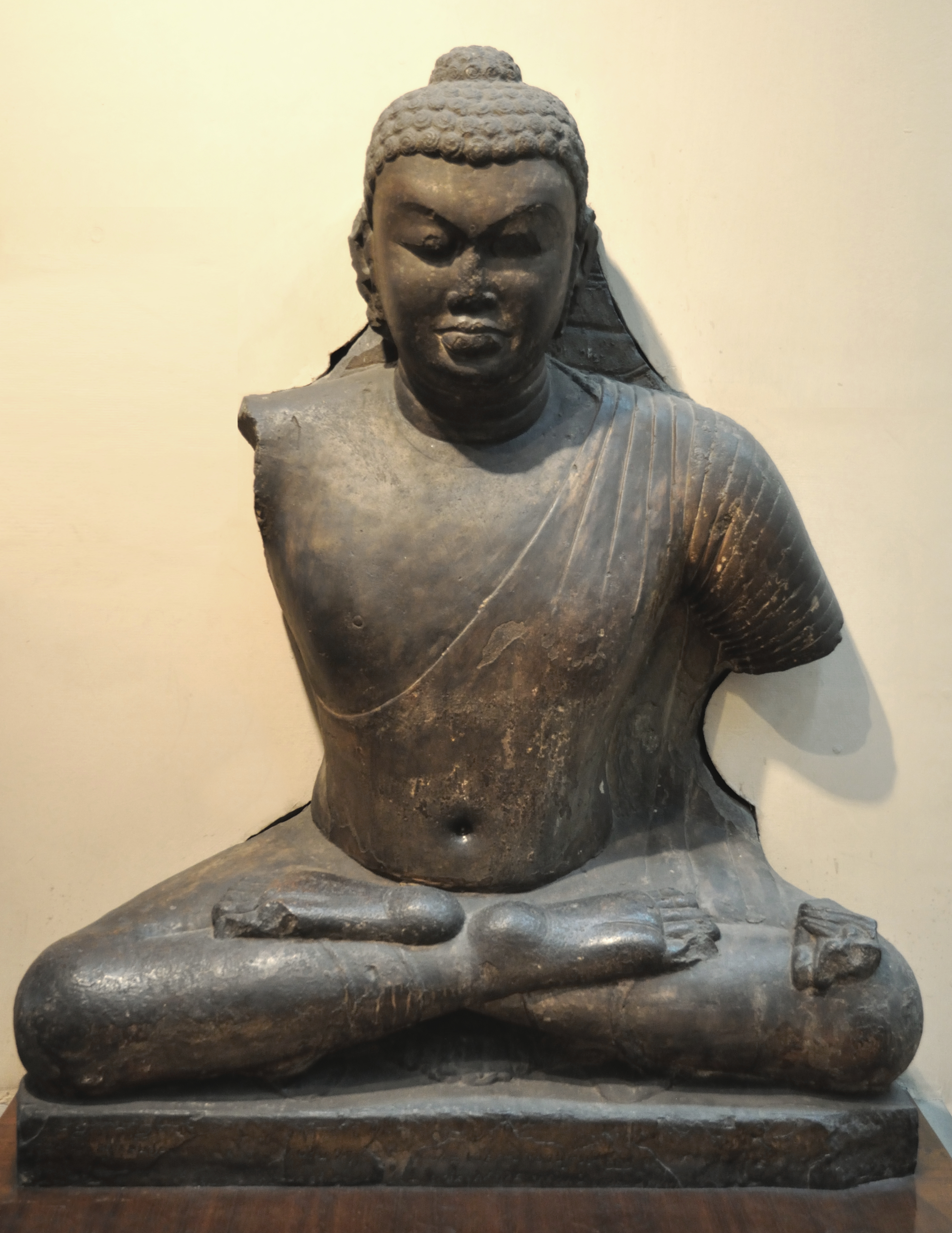
One of the earliest dated Gupta statues, a Bodhisattva derived from the Kushan style of Mathura art, inscribed "year 64" of the Gupta era, 384 CE, Bodh Gaya.

Several feudatories of Chandragupta are known from historical records:

- Maharaja Sanakanika, a feudatory known from the Udayagiri inscription that records his construction of a Vaishnava temple.
- Maharaja Trikamala, a feudatory known from a Gaya inscription engraved on a Bodhisattva image
- Maharaja Shri Vishvamitra Svami, a feudatory known from a seal found at Vidisha
- Maharaja Svamidasa, the ruler of Valkha, was also probably a Gupta feudatory if we assume that his inscription is dated in the Gupta calendar era; according to another theory, his inscription is dated in the Kalachuri calendar era.

The following ministers and officers of Chandragupta are known from various historical records:

- Virasena Saba, foreign minister, known from the Udayagiri inscription recording his construction of a Shiva temple
- Amrakardava, a military officer, known from the Sanchi inscription recording his donations to the local Buddhist monastery
- Shikhara-svami, a minister; according to historian K. P. Jayaswal's theory, he was the author of the political treatise Kamandakiya Niti

== Navaratnas ==
Jyotirvidabharana (22.10), a treatise attributed to Kalidasa, states that nine famous scholars known as the Navaratnas ("nine gems") attended the court of the legendary Vikramaditya. Besides Kalidasa himself, these included Amarasimha, Dhanvantari, Ghatakarapara, Kshapanaka, Shanku, Varahamihira, Vararuchi, and Vetala Bhatta. However, there is no historical evidence to show that these nine scholars were contemporary figures or proteges of the same king. Jyotirvidabharana is considered a literary forgery of a date later than Kalidasa by multiple scholars. There is no mention of such "Navaratnas" in earlier literature, and D. C. Sircar calls this tradition "absolutely worthless for historical purposes".

Nevertheless, multiple scholars believe that one of these Navaratnas – Kalidasa – may have indeed flourished during the reign of Chandragupta II. These scholars include William Jones, A. B. Keith, and Vasudev Vishnu Mirashi among others. It is possible that Kalidasa was a court poet of Chandragupta.

== Religion ==
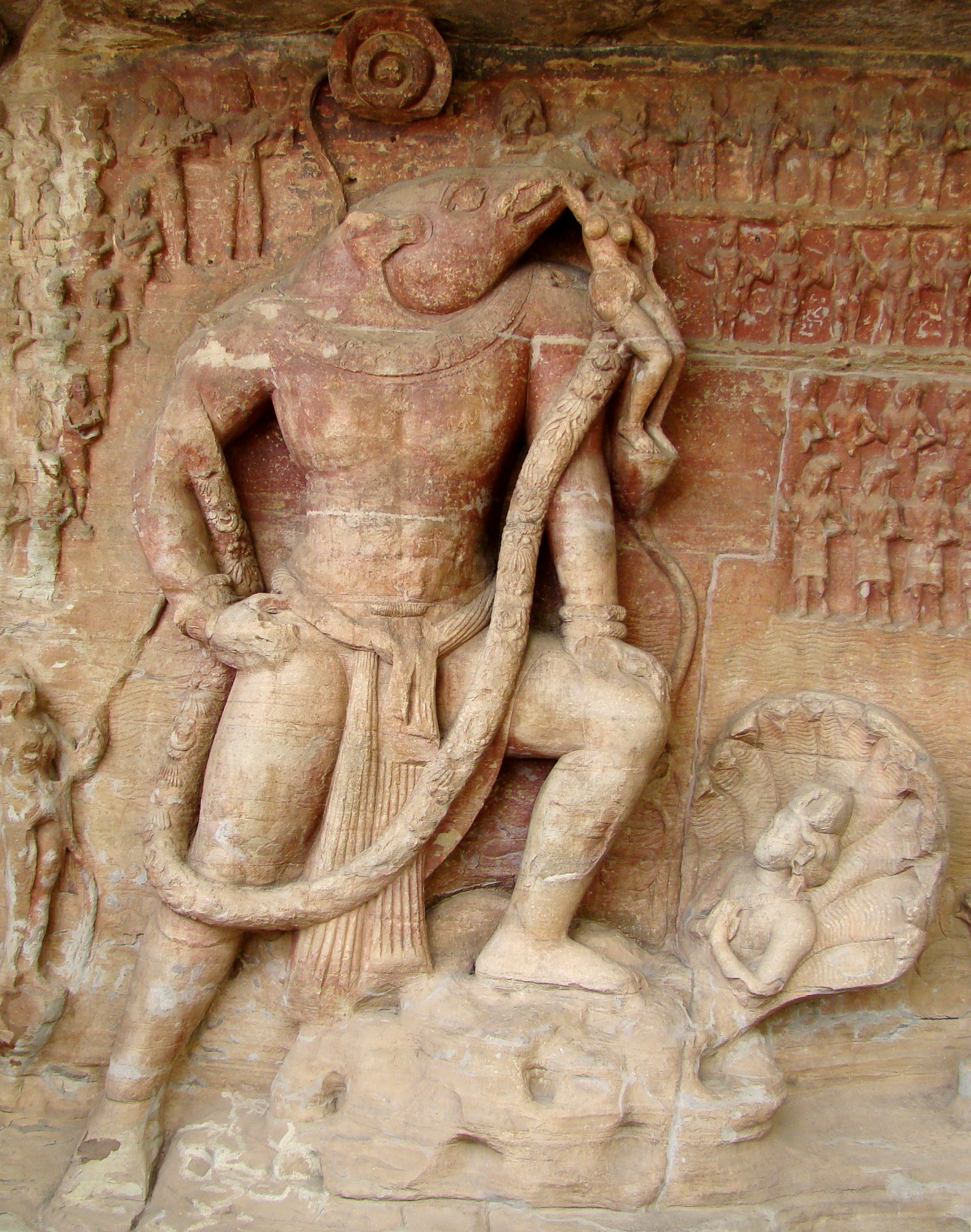
Chandragupta II is associated with the development of Vaishnavism in India, and the establishment of the Udayagiri Caves with Vaishnava iconography (here Varaha saving the world from chaos). Circa 400.

Many gold and silver coins of Chandragupta, as well the inscriptions issued by him and his successors, describe him as a parama-bhagvata, that is, a devotee of the god Vishnu. One of his gold coins, discovered at Bayana, calls him chakra-vikramah, literally, "[one who is] powerful [due to his possession of the] discus", and shows him receiving a discus from Vishnu.

An Udayagiri inscription records the construction of a Vaishnava cave temple by Chandragupta's feudatory Maharaja Sanakanika, in year 82 of the Gupta era (c. 401–402).

Chandragupta was also tolerant of other faiths. The Udayagiri inscription of Chandragupta's foreign minister Virasena records the construction of a temple dedicated to the god Shambhu (Shiva). An inscription found at Sanchi near Udayagiri records donations to the local Buddhist monastery by his military officer Amrakardava, in year 93 of the Gupta era (c. 412–413).

== Faxian's visit ==
Chinese pilgrim Faxian visited India during the reign of Chandragupta and spent around six years in the Gupta kingdom. He was mostly interested in Buddhist religious affairs and did not bother to record the name of the reigning king. His account presents an idealised picture of the Gupta administration, and not everything he states can be taken at face value. However, his description of the kingdom as a peaceful and prosperous one seems to be generally true, attested by the fact that he did not face any brigandage unlike the later Chinese pilgrim Xuanzang.

Faxian describes Madhya-desha ("Middle kingdom"), the region to the southeast of Mathura, as a populous region with good climate and happy people. He mentions that the citizens were not required to "register their households or attend to any magistrates and their rules". Faxian mentions that wicked repeated rebels had their right hand cut off by the king's administration, but otherwise, there was no corporal punishment for crimes: the criminals were only fined, lightly or heavily, according to the severity of the crime. According to Faxian, the king's bodyguards and attendants all received salaries.

Faxian mentions that other than the untouchable Chandalas, the people did not consume meat, intoxicating drinks, onions or garlic. The Chandalas lived apart from other people and struck a piece of wood to announce their presence when they entered a city or a marketplace: this would enable other people to avoid contact with them. Only the Chandalas engaged in the fisheries and hunting and sold meat. In the general markets, there were no butchers' shops or alcohol dealers, and the people did not keep pigs or fowl. According to historian R. C. Majumdar, Faxian's observations about the people's food habits seem to have been based on his contact with the Buddhist religious community and may not be applicable to the general public.

Faxian mentions that the people used cowries for buying and selling goods.

Faxian mentions the Pataliputra region as the most prosperous part of the Middle kingdom, describing its people as benevolent and righteous. He describes an annual Buddhist celebration, which involved a procession of 20 grand carts of Buddhas, the Brahmanas's invitation to the Buddhas to enter the city, and music performances. He mentions that in the cities, the Vaishya chiefs had established centres for dispensing charity and medical help to the destitute. These centres attracted the poor, the orphans, the widowers, the childless, the handicapped, and the sick, who were examined by doctors and given food and medicine until they got better.

== Inscriptions ==
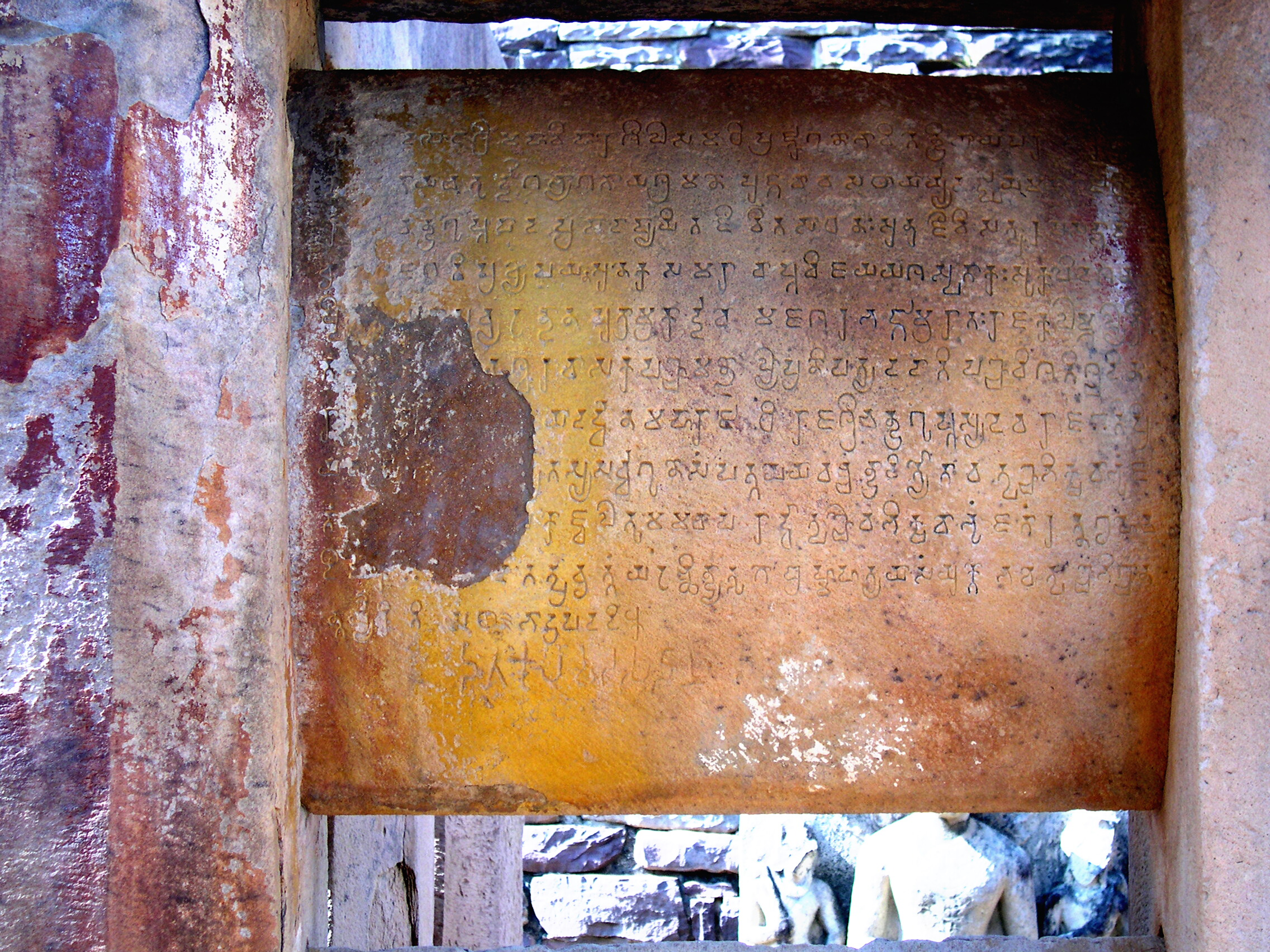
Sanchi inscription of Chandragupta II.

The following inscriptions of Chandragupta have been discovered:

- Mathura pillar inscription, dated to the year 61 of the Gupta era. The date has been interpreted as c. 380–381 by earlier scholars, but Harry Falk (2004) dates it to 388 (see Period of reign section above).
- Mathura pillar inscription, undated
- Udayagiri cave inscription, dated to the year 82 of the Gupta era
- Udayagiri cave inscription, undated
- Gadhwa stone inscription, dated to the year 88 of the Gupta era
- Sanchi stone inscription, dated to the year 93 of the Gupta era
- Mehrauli iron pillar inscription, undated

== Coinage ==
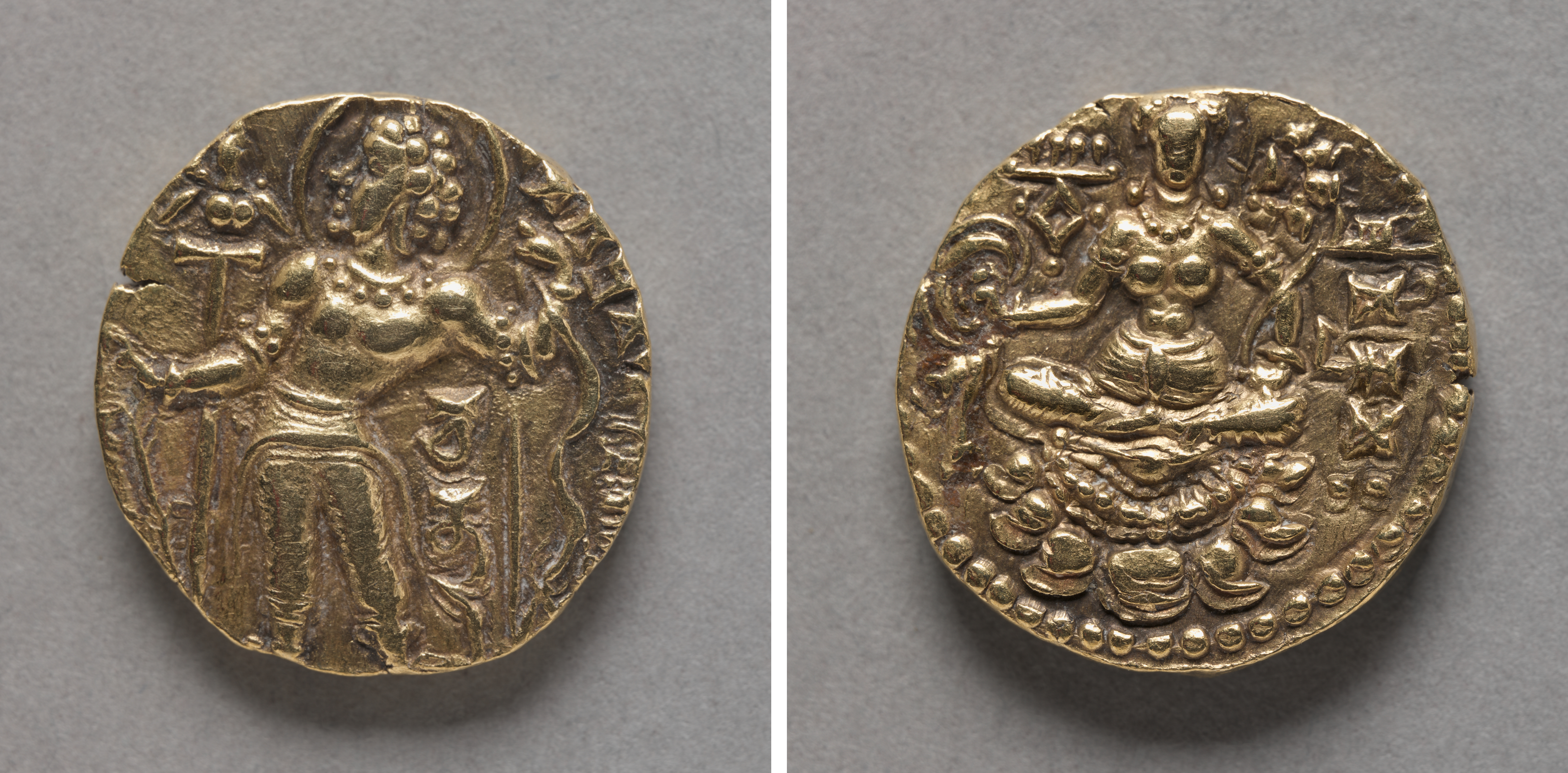
Gold coin of Chandragupta II, with a figure of an archer (obverse), and with a figure of the Indian goddess of good fortune, Shri, seated on a lotus (reverse), Cleveland Museum of Art

Chandragupta continued issuing most of the gold coin types introduced by his father Samudragupta, such as the Sceptre type (rare for Chandragupta II), the Archer type, and the Tiger-Slayer type. However, Chandragupta II also introduced several new types, such as the Horseman type and the Lion-slayer type, both of which were used by his son Kumaragupta I.

Chandragupta's various gold coins depict his martial spirit or peacetime pursuits.

Lion-slayer type
These coins depict Chandragupta slaying a lion and bear the legend simha-vikrama. Similar coins issued by his father Samudragupta depict the king slaying a tiger and bear the legend vyaghra-parakramaha. Historian R. C. Majumdar theorises that Chandragupta's conquest of present-day Gujarat (where the Asiatic lion is found) may have presented him with an opportunity to hunt lions, resulting in the substitution of tiger with lion on the imperial coins.

Couch-and-flower type
These coins depict Chandragupta seated on a couch and holding a flower in his right hand. The legend "rupa-kriti" occurs below the couch. These coins are similar to Samudragupta's coins which depict the king playing a musical instrument.

Rider type
These coins depict the king riding a fully-caparisoned horse.

Coins of Chandragupta II

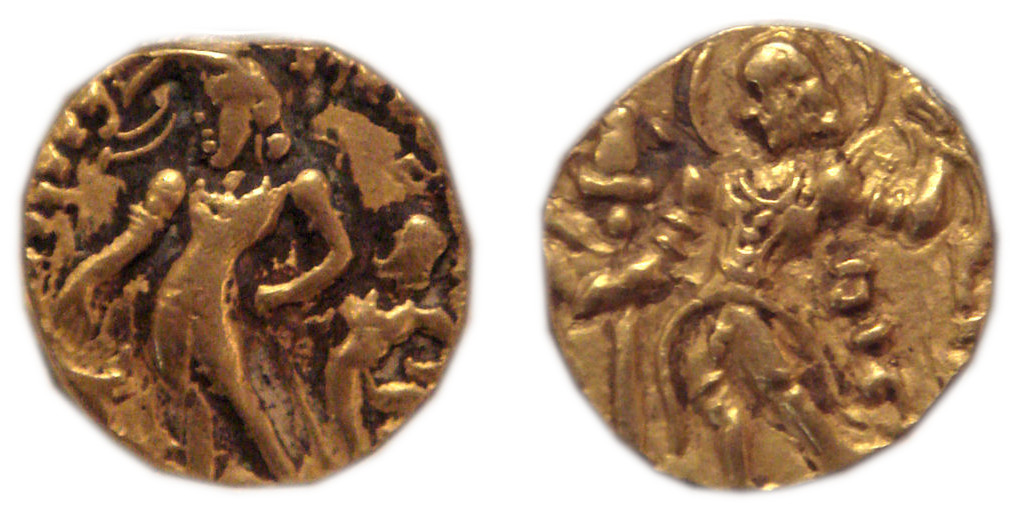
Obverse of "Chhatra" type (left) and "Archer" type (right) coins

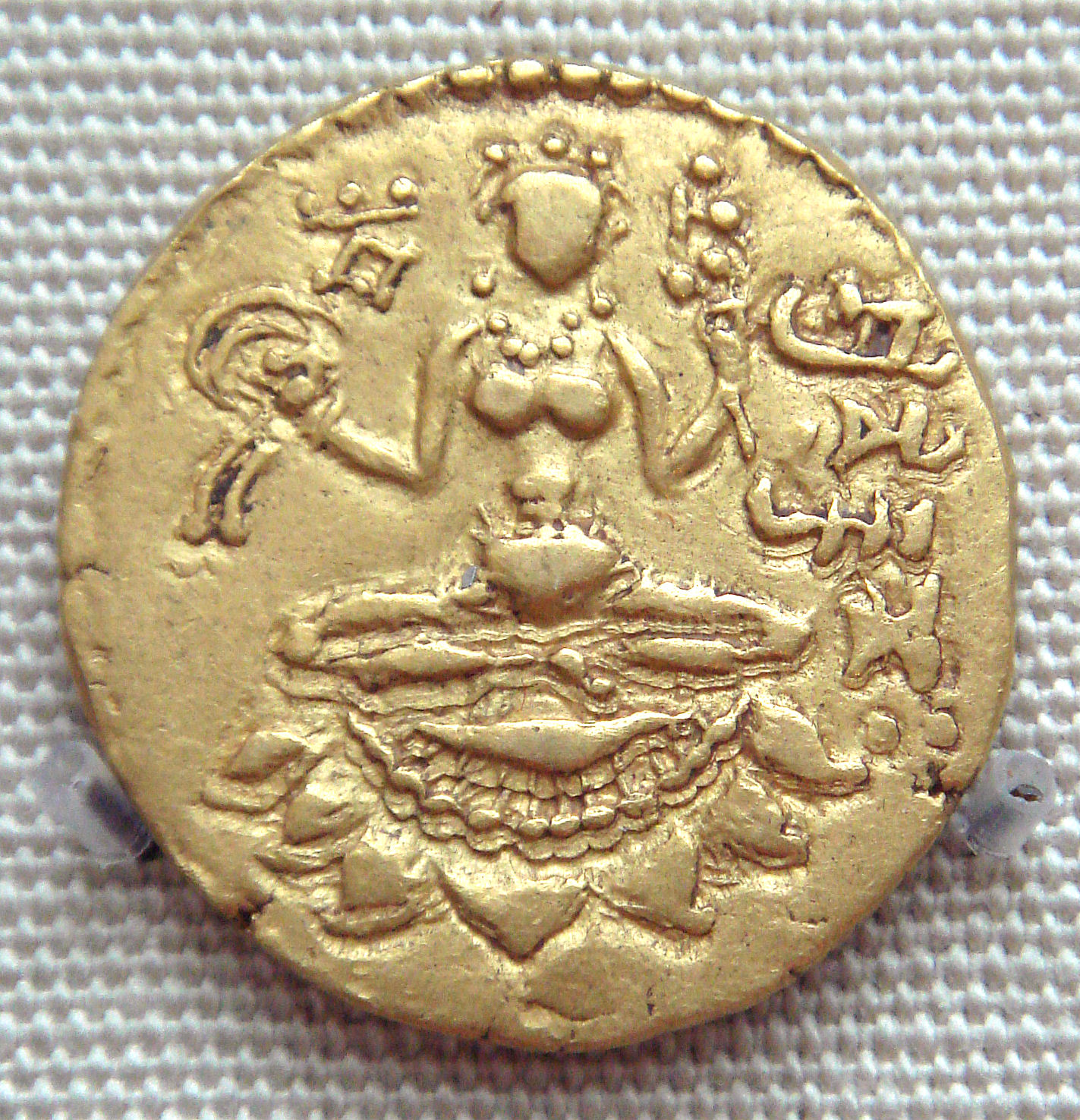
Coin with the king's name in Brahmi script

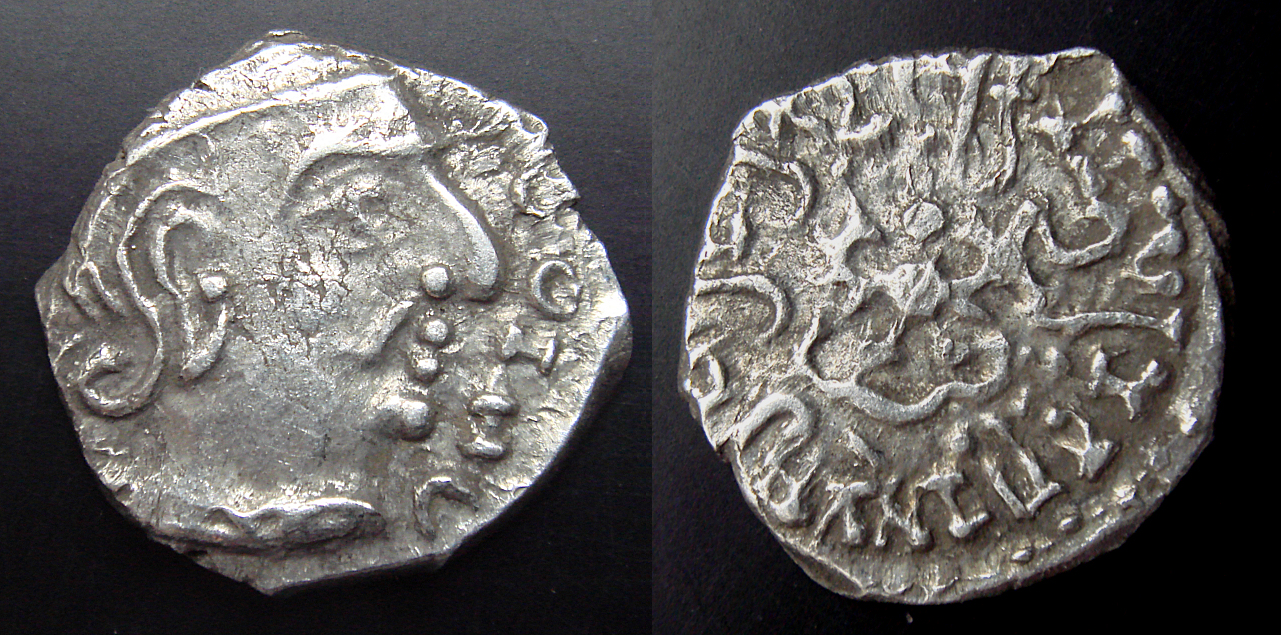
Silver coin in Western Satraps style (15mm, 2.1 grams.)
Various gold coins of Chandragupta II

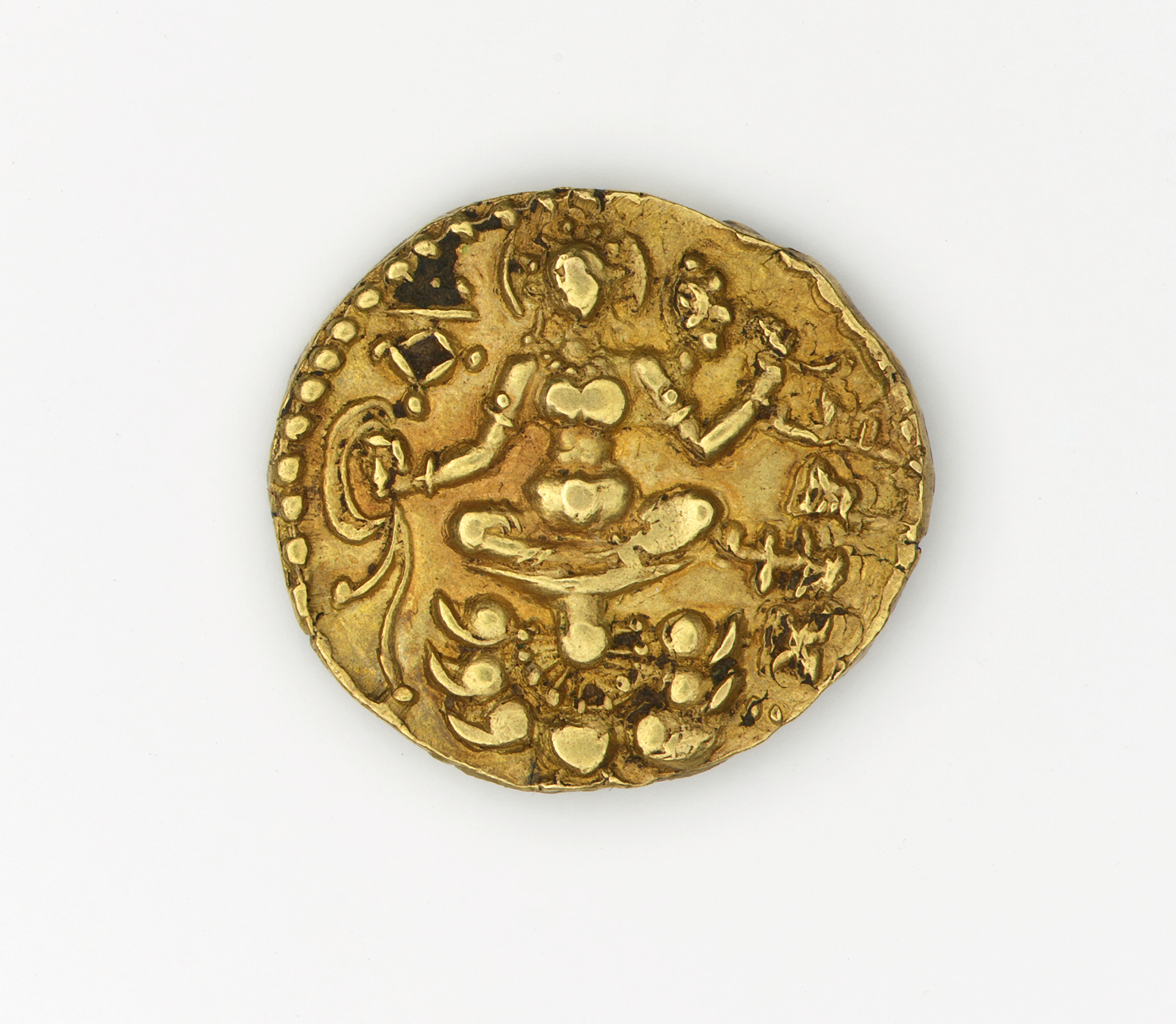

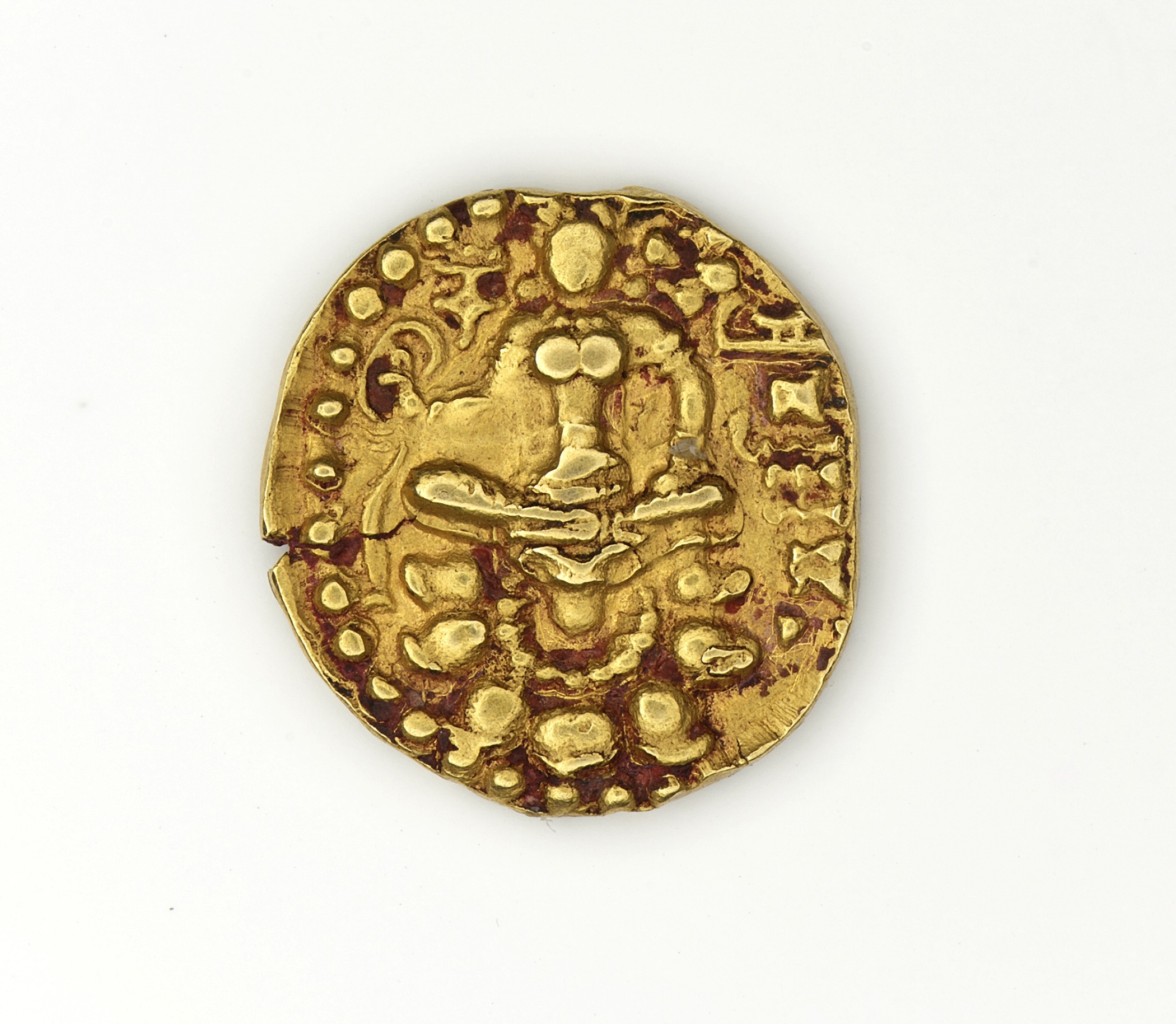

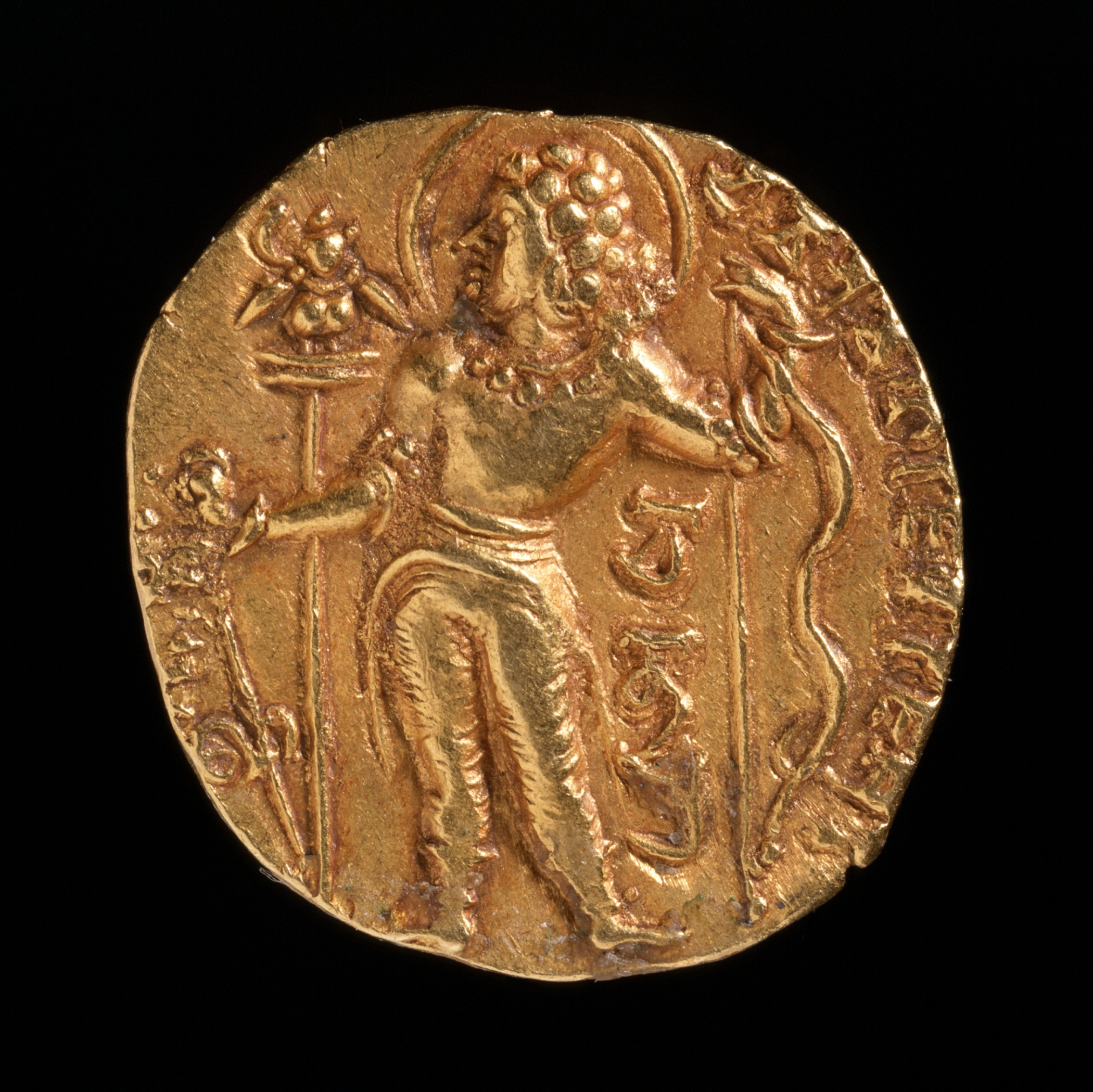

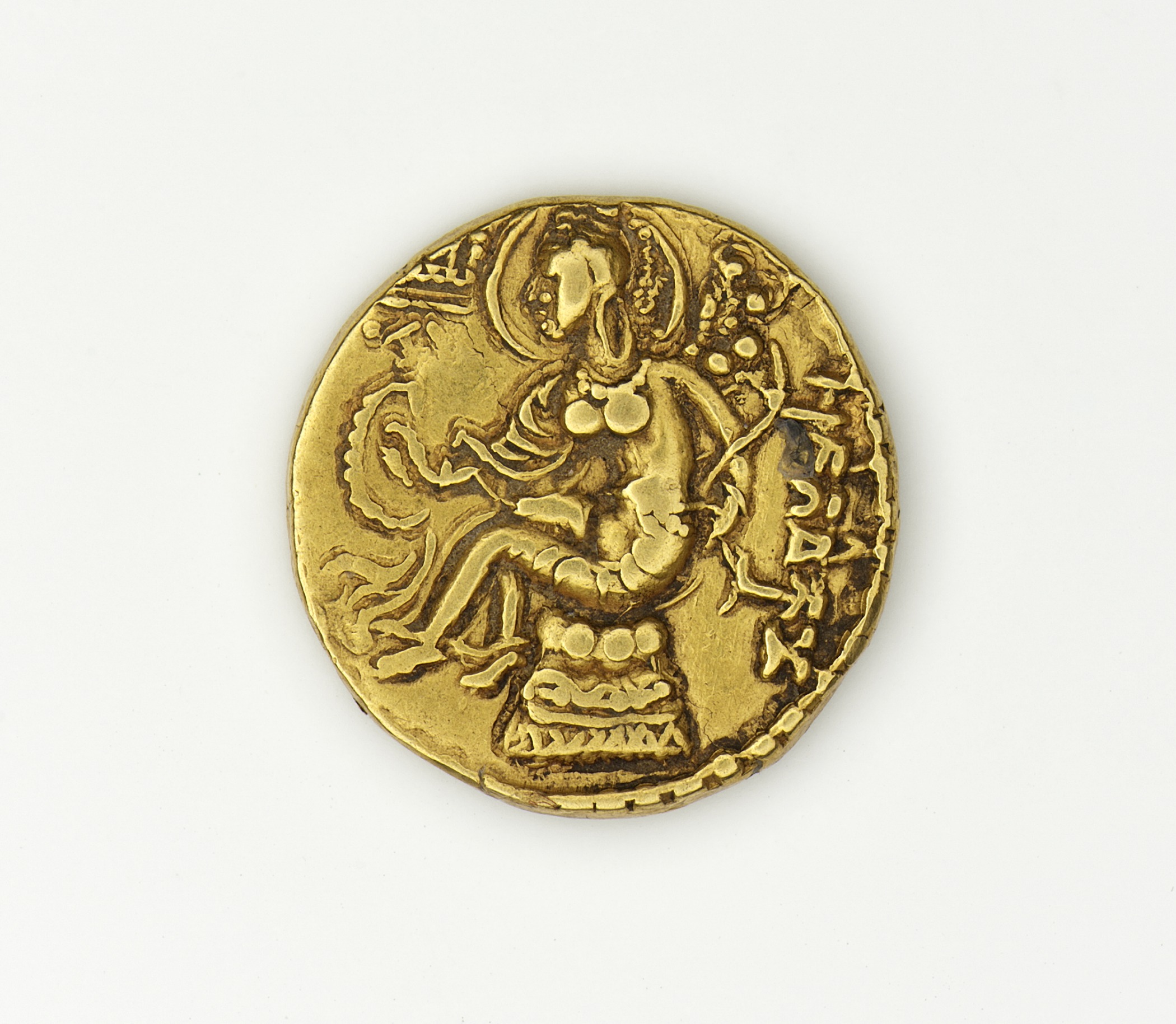

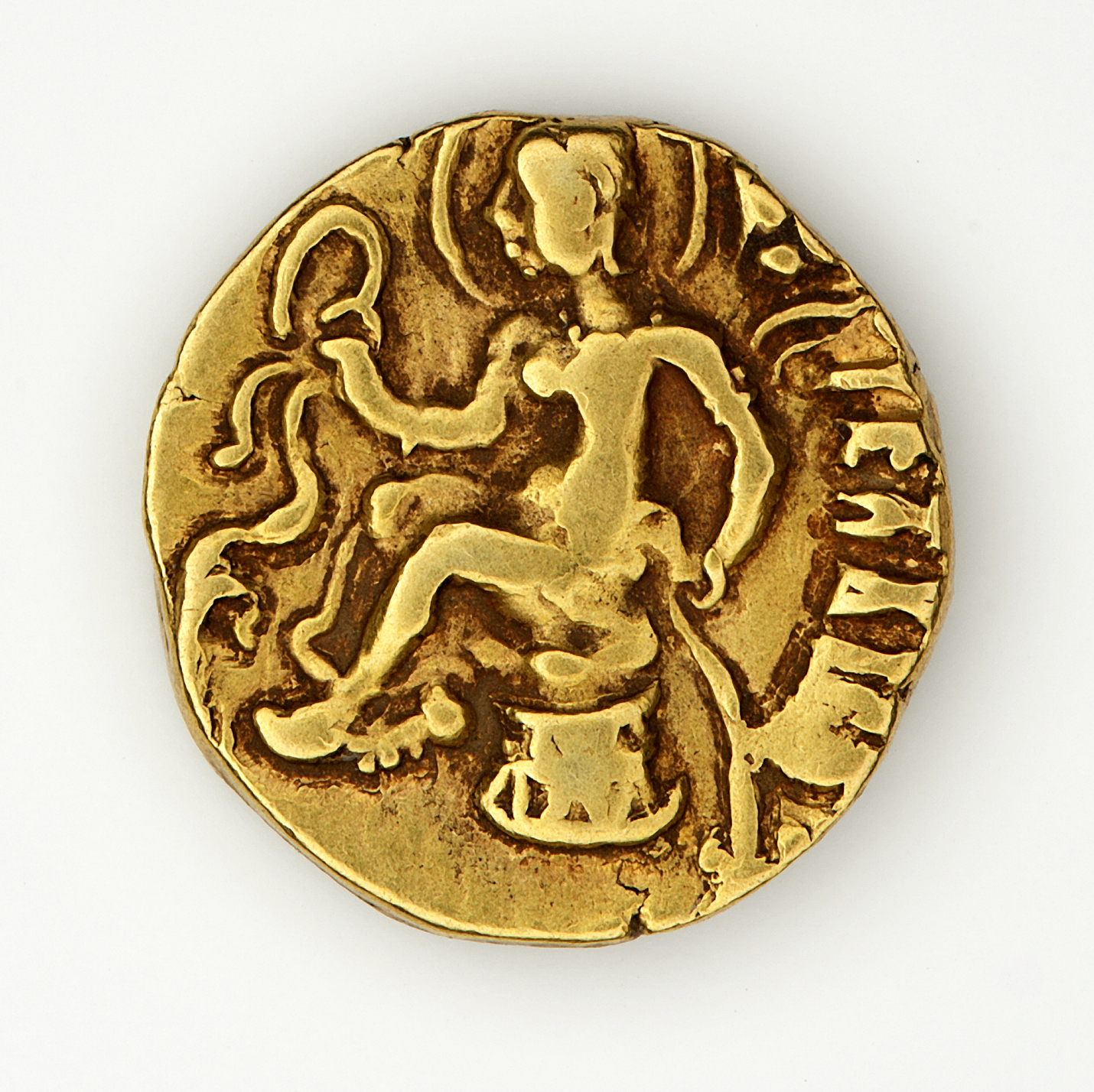

In addition, Chandragupta II was the first Gupta king to issue silver coins. These coins were intended to replace the silver coinage of the Western Kshatrapas after Chandragupta II defeated them and were modelled on the Kshatrapa coinage. The main difference was to replace the dynastic symbol of the Kshatrapas (the three-arched hill) by the dynastic symbol of the Guptas (the mythic eagle Garuda). The obverse of these coins depicts a bust of the king, with corrupted Greek legend "OOIHU". The reverse features the Brahmi script legend "Chandragupta Vikramaditya, King of Kings, and a devotee of Vishnu", around Garuda, the mythic eagle and dynastic symbol of the Guptas.

== Personality ==
The Udayagiri inscription of Virasena describes Chandragupta as a "king of kings" as well as an ascetic rajadhirajarshi, and declares that his activities were "beyond comprehension".

== Identification with the legendary Vikramaditya ==
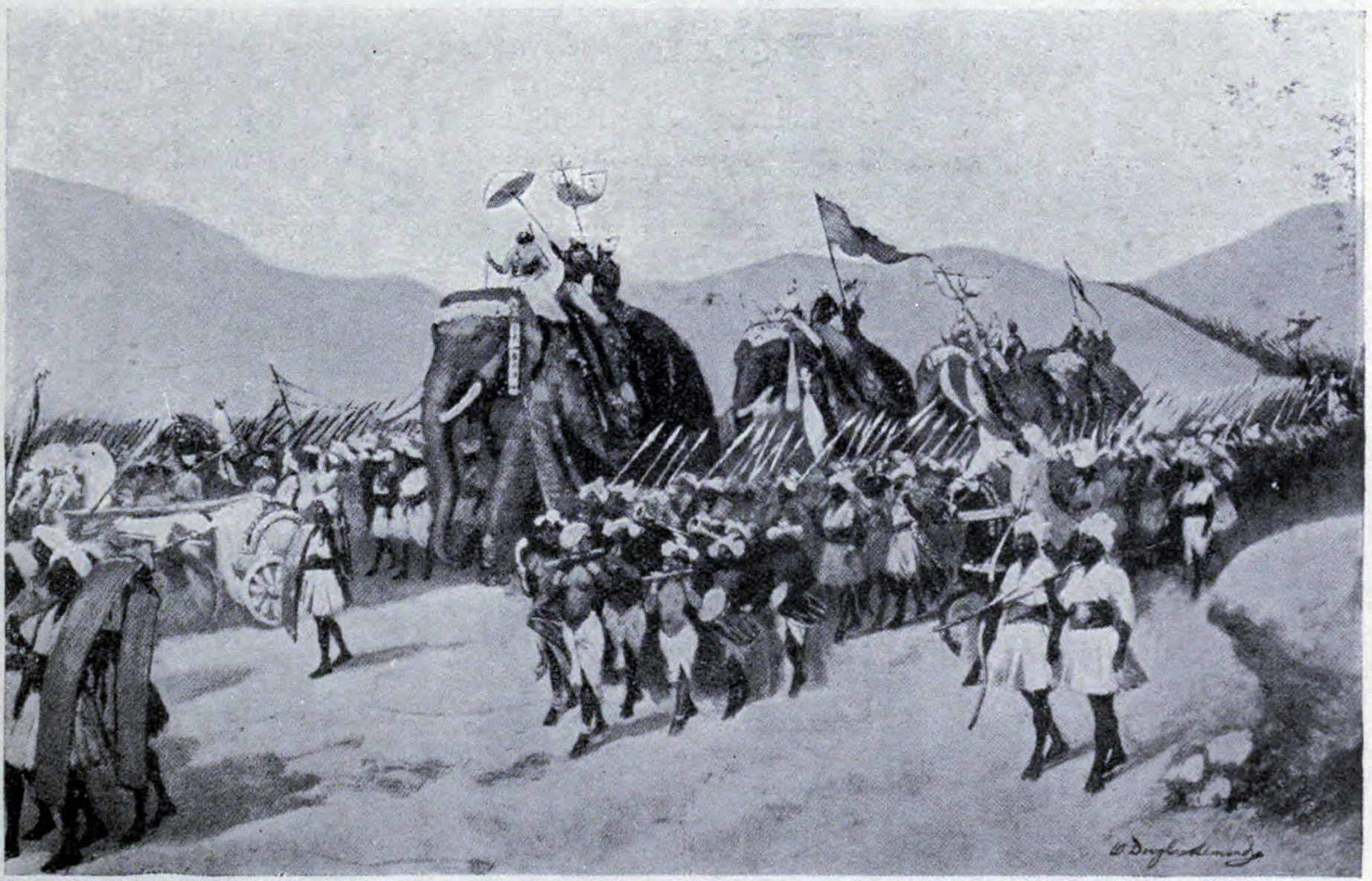
Vikramaditya goes forth to war, a modern artist's imagination

Vikramaditya is a legendary emperor of ancient India, who is characterised as the ideal king, known for his generosity, courage, and patronage to scholars. A number of historians believe that at least some of the Vikramaditya legends are based on Chandragupta II. These historians include D. R. Bhandarkar, V. V. Mirashi and D. C. Sircar among others.

Based on some coins and the Supia pillar inscription, it is believed that Chandragupta II adopted the title "Vikramaditya". The Cambay and Sangli plates of the Rashtrakuta king Govinda IV use the epithet "Sahasanka" for Chandragupta II. The name "Sahasanka" has also been applied to the legendary Vikramaditya.

The legendary Vikramaditya is said to have defeated the Śaka invaders, and was therefore, known as Śakari ("enemy of the Śakas). Chandragupta II conquered Malwa after defeating the Western Kshatrapas (a branch of Śakas); he also expelled the Kushanas from Mathura. His victory over these foreign tribes was probably transposed on upon a fictional character, resulting in the Vikramaditya legends.

According to most legends, Vikramaditya had his capital at Ujjain, although some legends mention him as the king of Pataliputra. The Guptas had their capital at Pataliputra. According to D. C. Sircar, Chandragupta II may have defeated the Shaka invaders of Ujjain, and placed his son Govindagupta as a viceroy there. As a result, Ujjain might have become a second capital of the Gupta Empire, and subsequently, legends about him (as Vikramaditya) might have developed. Guttas of Guttavalal, a minor dynasty based in present-day Karnataka, claimed descent from the imperial Guptas. The Caudadanapura inscription of the Guttas alludes to the legendary Vikramaditya ruling from Ujjayni, and several Gutta royals were named "Vikramaditya". According to Vasundhara Filliozat, their reference to the legendary Vikramaditya is simply because they confused him with Chandragupta II. However, D. C. Sircar sees this as further proof that the legendary Vikramaditya was based on Chandragupta II.

=== Vikram Samvat ===
Vikrama Samvat, an Indian calendar era beginning in 57 BCE, is associated with the legendary Vikramaditya. However, this association did not exist before 9th century. The earlier sources call this era by various names, including Kṛṭa, the era of the Malava tribe, or simply, Samvat. Scholars such as D. C. Sircar and D. R. Bhandarkar believe that the name of the era changed to "Vikram Samvat" after the reign of Chandragupta II, who had adopted the title Vikramaditya.
