= Amrakarddava =

- Minister of the Gupta Empire
- Reign: c. 4th–5th century CE
- Born: Sukuli-desa, Madhya Pradesh
- Dynasty: Karddava (possibly Naga lineage)
- Religion: Buddhism
- Military career
- Battles / wars: Gupta–Saka Wars

Amrakarddava was a general from Sukuli-desa (present day Madhya Pradesh) in the service of Emperor Chandragupta II of the Gupta Empire. He was known for his military skill and fought and won many of the major battles, including campaigns over the Saka war.

== Etymology ==
The first part possibly referring to mango tree, "Amra" is his name of becoming personal. The second part, "Karddava," comes from "Kadru," the mythological Indian mother of serpents. By way of metathesis, "Kadrava" becomes "Karddava," "born of Kadru." This indicates a relationship with the Nagas, serpent-demons who inhabit the netherworld.

== Military achievements ==
Amrakarddava's military career is emphasized in inscriptions that speak of him as having won "banners of victory and fame in many battles." This warrior, who became one of his important & notable achievements where he participated in the Gupta–Saka Wars along with Emperor Chandragupta II.

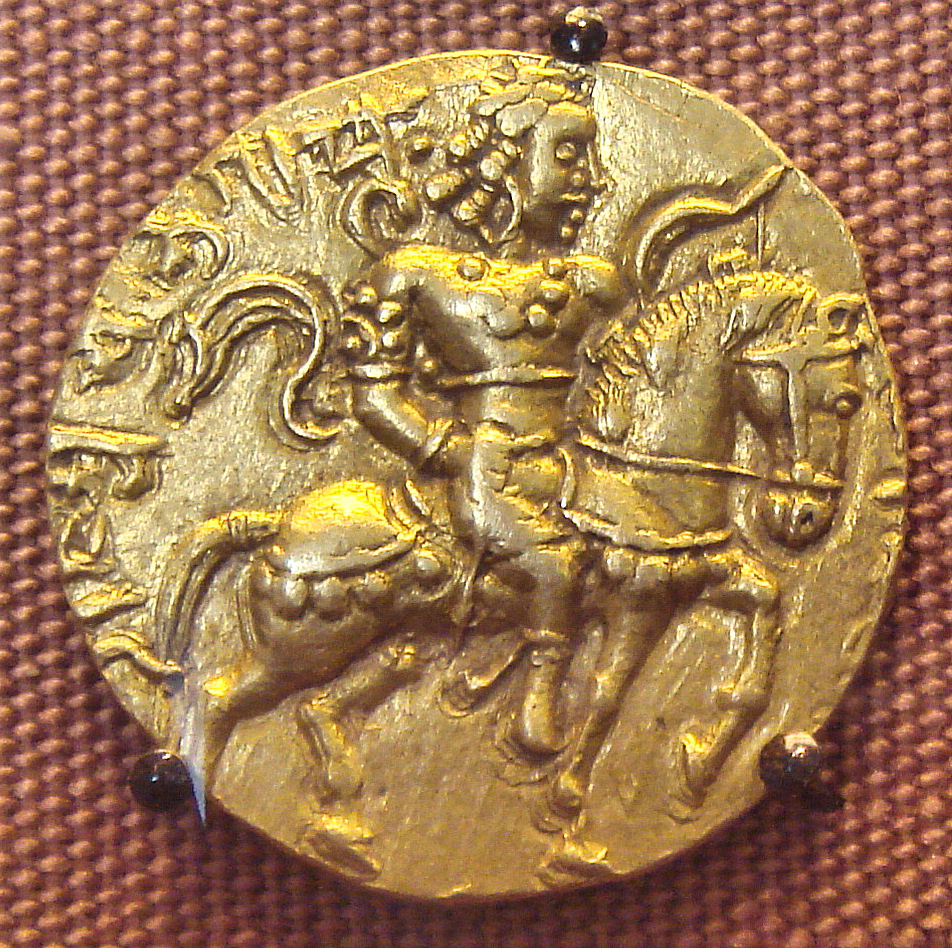
An 8 gram gold coin featuring Chandragupta II astride a caparisoned horse with a bow in his left hand. The name Cha-gu-pta appears in the upper left quadrant.

An inscription from one of the caves at Udayagiri Hill, about two miles northwest of Bhilsa, notes the dedication of a cave to Sambhu by a minister named Virasena who was in the service of Chandragupta II. This undecorated inscription is believed to refer to the Saka war.

A second inscription, dated to Gupta Year 93 (the date gives the Gregorian equivalent of 412–413 CE), records donations made by Amrakarddava to a major Buddhist Vihara on the site. Historians have connected this note to the Saka war, and they have argued that this conflict lasted for a long time.

== Patronage of Buddhism ==
Apart from his military achievements, Amrakarddava is also known to have patronized Buddhist monasteries. Furthermore, such patronage is proof of his economic patronage to temple grounds and places of worship during his time. A donation mentioned in an inscription indicates that Amrakarddava gave a village and 25 dinars so that ten Buddhist monks and two lamps would be maintained in the monastery at Sanchi.

== Legacy ==
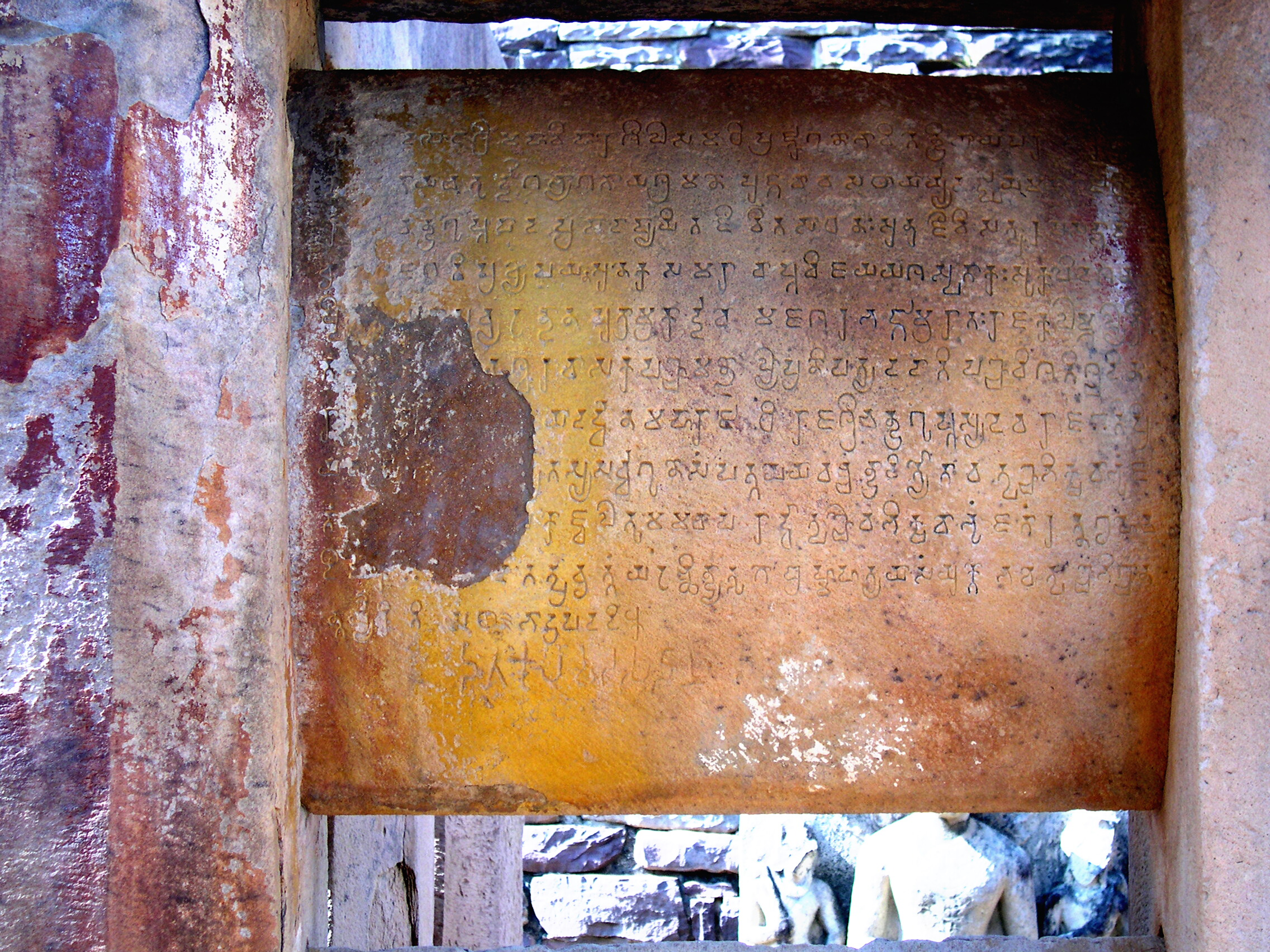
The victorious Sanchi inscription of Chandragupta II (412-413 CE).

Amrakarddava is an important figure in the context of Gupta history, as he is both a military man and a patron. His contribution to the Saka war, as well as his patronage of Buddhism, serves to emphasize his multifaceted contributions to the Gupta Empire.

== See also ==
- Chandragupta II
- Virasena Saba
