= Dattadevi =

Chief queen of Samundragupta

Empress Consort of the Gupta Empire
- Tenure: Unknown - c. 375
- Predecessor: Kumaradevi (as the wife of emperor)
- Successor: Dhruvadevi
- Born: Before 330
- Died: After 375
- Spouse: Samudragupta
- Issue: Chandragupta II and possibly Ramagupta
- House: Gupta Empire
- Dynasty: Gupta (by Marriage)
- Religion: Hinduism

Dattadevi was the wife of Gupta King Samudragupta. She was the mother of Samudragupta's son and successor Chandragupta II, She was most probably married to Samudragupta during his educational career. Harisena, Samudragupta's court poet and close friend, played an important role in the marriage of Samudragupta to Dattadevi. She is described as a "virtuous and faithful wife" in an Eran inscription.
