= Dhruvadevi =

Queen-Consort to Chandragupta II

Empress Consort of the Gupta Empire
- Reign: c. 380 – c. 415
- Predecessor: Dattadevi
- Successor: Anantadevi
- Born: c. Before 350
- Died: c. After 415
- Spouse: Chandragupta II
- Issue: Govindagupta; Kumaragupta I
- House: Gupta Empire
- Dynasty: Gupta
- Religion: Hinduism

Dhruva-devi was the queen-consort to the Gupta emperor Chandragupta II (r. c. 380 – c. 415 CE), who ruled in present-day northern India. She was the mother of his successor Kumaragupta I, and was most probably same as Dhruva-svamini, who has been mentioned as a queen of Chandragupta and the mother of prince Govindagupta in a clay seal inscription as well as the Empress consort of the Gupta Empire.

According to the Sanskrit play Devi-Chandraguptam, which is now partially lost, Dhruvadevi was originally a queen of Chandragupta's elder brother Ramagupta, who decided to surrender her to a Shaka enemy after being besieged. Chandragupta entered the enemy camp disguised as the queen, and killed the enemy. A reconstruction of the play, based on other literary and epigraphic evidence, suggests that Chandragupta later killed Ramagupta, and married Dhruva-devi. The historicity of this narrative is debated among modern historians, with some scholars dismissing it as a work of fiction.

== In Gupta records ==
The word "Dhruva" literally means unchangeable or constant, and is the Sanskrit name for the pole star. According to the Gupta records, Dhruva-devi was the mother of Chandragupta's successor Kumaragupta I. The Basarh clay seal of Govindagupta mentions Dhruva-svamini as a queen of Chandragupta, and the mother of Govindagupta. It is unlikely that Chandragupta had two different queens with similar names: it appears that Dhruvasvamini was most probably another name for Dhruvadevi, and that Govindagupta was a real brother of Kumaragupta.

== In Devi-Chandraguptam ==
According to the Sanskrit play Devi-Chandraguptam, which is now available only in form of some fragments, Dhruvadevi was originally a queen of Chandragupta's elder brother Ramagupta. Once, Ramagupta was besieged by a Shaka enemy, who demanded Dhruva-devi as part of a peace agreement. Ramagupta agreed to surrender Dhruva-devi to the enemy, but Chandragupta went to the enemy camp disguised as the queen, and killed the enemy. The rest of the story is not clear from the surviving fragments, but based on later literary and epigraphic references, it may be reconstructed as follows: Ramagupta's public image suffered as a result of his decision to surrender his wife to an enemy, while Chandragupta was regarded as a hero by the subjects. Ramagupta grew jealous of his brother, and tried to persecute him. Chandragupta feigned madness to escape his brother's enmity, but ultimately killed him, became the new king, and married Dhruva-devi.

Several modern historians believe that the play is based on true historical events. According to this theory, Ramagupta agreed to surrender his queen Dhruvadevi to the Shaka king, alienating her as well as his subjects. However, Chandragupta heroically defeated the enemy, winning the admiration of the queen and the subjects. Chandragupta ultimately de-throned his brother, and married Dhruvadevi. Historian Romila Thapar theorizes that the play may have been written in the Gupta court, possibly during the reign of Chandragupta's successors. The author's intention may have been to justify Chandragupta's unorthodox act of killing his elder brother and marrying his predecessor's wife.
