= Supia =

Supia may refer to:

- Supía, Caldas, a town in Colombia
- Supiya, a village in Madhya Pradesh, India
- Beedrill, a Pokémon
