= Ramagupta =

Gupta emperor c. 375

- Maharajadhiraja

Gupta emperor
- Reign: c. 375
- Predecessor: Samudragupta
- Successor: Chandragupta II
- Spouse: Dhruvadevi
- House: Gupta dynasty
- Father: Samudragupta
- Religion: Jainism, Hinduism

Ramagupta (IAST: Rāma-gupta; r. c. late 4th century CE), according to the Sanskrit play Devichandraguptam, was an emperor of the Gupta dynasty of northern India. The surviving fragments of the play, combined with other literary evidence, suggest that he agreed to surrender his wife Dhruvadevi to a Shaka enemy: However, his brother Chandragupta II killed the Shaka enemy, and later dethroned him, marrying Dhruvadevi.

The official Gupta genealogy does not mention Ramagupta, and therefore, the historicity of the Devichandraguptam narrative is debated. Several other sources refer to the events mentioned in the play, but these sources do not mention Ramagupta by name, and may be based on the play itself. Three undated inscriptions, written in a variety of the Gupta script and discovered in central India, mention a king called Ramagupta: this seems to attest the existence of a Gupta emperor named Ramagupta, although it does not conclusively prove the historicity of the Devichandraguptam story. Some coins discovered in central India have also been attributed to Ramagupta, but this attribution has not been unanimously accepted by modern historians.

== Sources ==
Ramagupta's name does not appear in the official records of the Gupta dynasty. According to the official Gupta genealogy, Samudragupta's successor was Chandragupta II, whose queen was Dhruvadevi. It is possible that the records of Ramagupta's successors omit his name from genealogical lists because he was not their ancestor.

Ramagupta is mentioned in the Sanskrit-language play Devichandraguptam. The original text of the play is now lost, but its extracts survive in other works. Several later literary and epigraphic sources corroborate the narrative of Devichandraguptam, although they do not mention Ramagupta by name (see Devichandraguptam § Historicity).

After the extracts of Devichandraguptam were first discovered by Sylvain Levi and R. Saraswati in 1923, Ramagupta's historicity became a matter of debate among historians. Some scholars, including Levi, dismissed Devichandraguptam as unreliable for the purposes of history. Others, such as RD Banerji and Henry Heras argued that the additional literary evidence was too strong to dismiss Ramagupta as a fictional character, and hoped that his existence would be proved by discovery of his coins in future. Subsequently, some scholars such as K. D. Bajpai attributed a few copper coins discovered in central India to Ramagupta, but others, such as D. C. Sircar disputed this attribution (see Coinage) below. Later, three Jain statue inscriptions referring to Maharajadhiraja Ramagupta were discovered at Durjanpur, and have been cited as proof for the existence of the king mentioned in the Devichandraguptam (see Inscriptions below).

== Reign ==
Based on the surviving passages of Devichandraguptam and other supporting evidence, modern scholars theorize that Ramagupta was the elder son and successor of the Gupta emperor Samudragupta.

According to the play, Ramagupta decided to surrender his wife Dhruva-devi (or Dhruva-svamini) to a Shaka enemy, but his younger brother Chandragupta went to the enemy camp disguised as the queen, and killed the enemy. According to the Devichandraguptam passage quoted in Bhoja's Shringara-Prakasha, the enemy camp was located at Alipura. Bana's Harsha-charita calls the place "Aripura" (literally "enemy's city"); one manuscript of Harsha-charita calls the place "Nalinapura".

The identity of Ramagupta's "Shaka" (IAST: Śaka) enemy is not certain. Proposed identifications include:

- Historian V. V. Mirashi identified him with the Kushan king who ruled in Punjab, and who is referred to as "Devaputra-Shahi-Shanushahi" in Samudragupta's Allahabad Pillar inscription.
- Historian A. S. Altekar identified him with Piro, a son of Kidara I, who controlled western and central Punjab. Altekar theorized that Piro invaded eastern Punjab, and Ramagupta attempted to check his advance, leading to a war.

Based on the Jain statue inscriptions (see #Inscriptions below), historian Tej Ram Sharma speculates that Ramagupta may have adopted "a peaceful style of life" after his humiliation by the Shaka enemy, which may explain his inclination towards Jainism.

Later, Chandragputa appears to have killed Ramagupta and married Dhruvadevi, who is mentioned as Chandragupta's queen in the Gupta records.

== Historicity ==
भगवतोर्हतः चन्द्रप्रभस्य प्रतिमेऽयं कारिता महाराजाधिराज-श्री-रामगुप्तेन उपदेशात् पाणिपात्रिक-चन्द्रक्षमाचार्य्य-क्षमण-श्रमण-प्रशिष्य-आचार्य्य सर्प्पसेन-क्षमण-शिष्यस्य गोलक्यान्त्या-सत्पुत्रस्य चेलु-क्षमणस्येति

— The Ramagupta Inscription found near Vidisha

The theory that Ramagupta was a historical person is supported by the following points:

- Inscriptions attributed to Ramagputa have been discovered in central India (see below). These inscriptions mention a king called Ramagupta who bore the imperial title Maharajadhiraja. Moreover, the inscriptions are in the Gupta Brahmi script of 4th-5th centuries CE, which proves that Ramagupta was a historical Gupta emperor.
- Dhruvadeva and Chandragupta, the two other main characters of the play Devichandraguptam, are known to be historical persons. The official records of the Gupta dynasty mention Chandragupta II as an emperor. Dhruvadevi is attested by her royal seal which describes her as the wife of Chandragupta and the mother of Govindagupta.
- The Eran inscription of Samudragupta appears to mention that his queen Datta-devi had many sons and grandsons, although this cannot be said with certainty because the inscription is mutilated.
- In the official Gupta genealogy, the kings are described as "meditating on the feet" of their fathers. However, in a departure from this convention, Chandragupta II is described as having been "accepted by his father" in his Mathura stone pillar inscription as well as Bihar and Bhitari inscriptions of Skandagupta. Scholars who believe the play to have a historical basis argue that this is a covert way of stating that his accession to the throne was contested.
- Several later texts and inscriptions (see Devichandraguptam § Historicity) refer to the episode mentioned in the Devichandraguptam, although these sources may be based on the play itself, and therefore, cannot be regarded as conclusive evidence corroborating the play's historicity.

=== Inscriptions ===
Two stone statues of Jain tirthankaras, discovered at Durjanpur (or Durjanpura) near Vidisha, bear inscriptions that mention Maharajadhiraja Ramagupta; the partially-damaged inscription on another similar statue also appears to mention his name. The statues were discovered while clearing a field with a bulldozer, and were partially damaged by the bulldozer.

Statue	State of preservation
A: Statue of Chandraprabha	Face of the tirthankara completely damaged, Face of the left-hand attendant figure damaged, Inscription well-preserved and complete.
B: Statue of Pushpadanta	Face of the tirthankara completely damaged, Attendant and prabhavali portions well-preserved, Last two lines of the inscription damaged.
C: Statue of Chandraprabha	Face of the tirthankara partially preserved, Attendant and prabhavali portions completely lost, Inscription erased (though some words and letters can be reconstructed based on the other two inscriptions).

The Chandraprabha statue inscription states:

This image of the Lord, the venerable Puspadanta/Chandraprabha, was commissioned by the Mahārājadhiraja Śrī Rāmagupta, at the instigation of Celüksamana, son of Golakyãntí, who is the pupil of the preceptor Sarpa-sena-ksamana and the grand pupil of the pãnipãtrikau Chandra-ksamana, preceptor (ãcãrya) and forbearing monk [ksamanasmmana].

Based on the reconstructed text, all three inscriptions appear to contain same text except the name of the tirthankara. They state that emperor Ramagupta caused the statues to be built at the behest of a mendicant called Chella Kshamana or Chelu-kshamana (IAST: Celū-kṣamaṇa).

These inscriptions do not mention that Ramagupta belonged to the Gupta dynasty, and do not mention any date. However, following arguments can be made to date them to the 4th century, and to support the identification of the Ramagupta mentioned in these inscriptions as a Gupta emperor:

- According to epigraphist G. S. Gai, who edited the inscriptions, the inscriptions feature the so-called southern or western variety of the Gupta script: the alphabet clearly resembles the alphabet of the Eran inscription of Samudragupta (who must have been Ramagupta's predecessor) and the Sanchi inscription of Chandragupta II (who must have been Ramagupta's successor). The medial 'i' character is different from the one featured in the Sanchi inscriptions, but such a character can also be found in earlier inscriptions, such as the Nandsa-Yupa inscriptions of the 3rd century. Thus, on palaeographic basis, the Ramagupta inscriptions can be assigned to the 4th century CE.
- According to Gai, the sculptural features and styles of the statues also suggest that they belong to the 4th century CE. The prabhavali (halo) is not as developed and stylized as in the 5th century Buddha images from Sanchi. The pedestals of the statues feature a chakra at the centre, instead of the characteristic lanchanas (traditional symbols) associated with the tirthankaras, which suggests that the images belong to an "early stage in the development of the Jaina iconography".
- Maharajadhiraja is an imperial title, which indicates that Ramagupta was a historical Gupta emperor.

However, according to another theory, the Ramagupta of the Durjanpur inscriptions is a later Gupta king, not the brother of Chandragupta II. Historian D. C. Sircar has dated these records to a later period, based on a comparison of letters and signs that occur in these inscriptions and the Sanchi inscriptions of Chandragupta II.

=== Coinage ===
A few copper coins, bearing the legend "Ramaguta" (Prakrit form of "Ramagupta") on the obverse, and the figure of a lion or a garuda on the reverse, have been found at Eran and Vidisha in Madhya Pradesh. Some scholars have attributed these coins to the Gupta ruler Ramagupta, but others believe him to be a distinct, local ruler. Since Garuda was the emblem of the imperial Gupta dynasty, numismatist K. D. Bajpai asserted that these coins were indeed issued by the Gupta emperor Ramagupta. Bajpai speculated that Samudragupta appointed his son Ramagupta as a governor of the eastern Malwa region in central India; Ramagupta was forced to stay there even after his father's death because of the war with the Shakas, and the events depicted in Devichandraguptam happened there.

However, historian D. C. Sircar doesn't find Bajpai's theory convincing, and states that the issuer of these coins may have been a local chief of imitated Gupta coinage after the decline of the Gupta dynast in the late 5th century CE. Sircar points out that a non-Gupta ruler named Harigupta is known to have issued copper coins that feature a garuda, and imitate the gold coins of Chandragupta II. Coins of another such imitator, named Indragupta, have been discovered at Kumhrar. Sircar also notes that other Gupta emperors are known to have issued gold coins, but no gold coins issued by Ramagupta have been discovered.

Numismatist Sanjeev Kumar identifies Ramagupta with Kacha based on a copper coin discovered in the Vidisha area. The obverse of this coin shows an Ashvamedha horse with the Brahmi text "Kācha", and the reverse reads "Rāmagupta Ma[harāja]". Kumar theorizes that the Ramagupta served as the governor of Vidisha and issued copper coins during the reign of his father Samudragupta. After the death of his father around 378 CE, he conducted an Ashvamedha ceremony, and declared himself the king assuming the regnal name Kācha. His younger brother Chandragupta II later killed him, and the play Devichandragupta was written as propaganda aimed at covering up this assassination.
