= Sacred Rock of Hunza =

Cultural heritage site in Gilgit-Baltistan, Pakistan

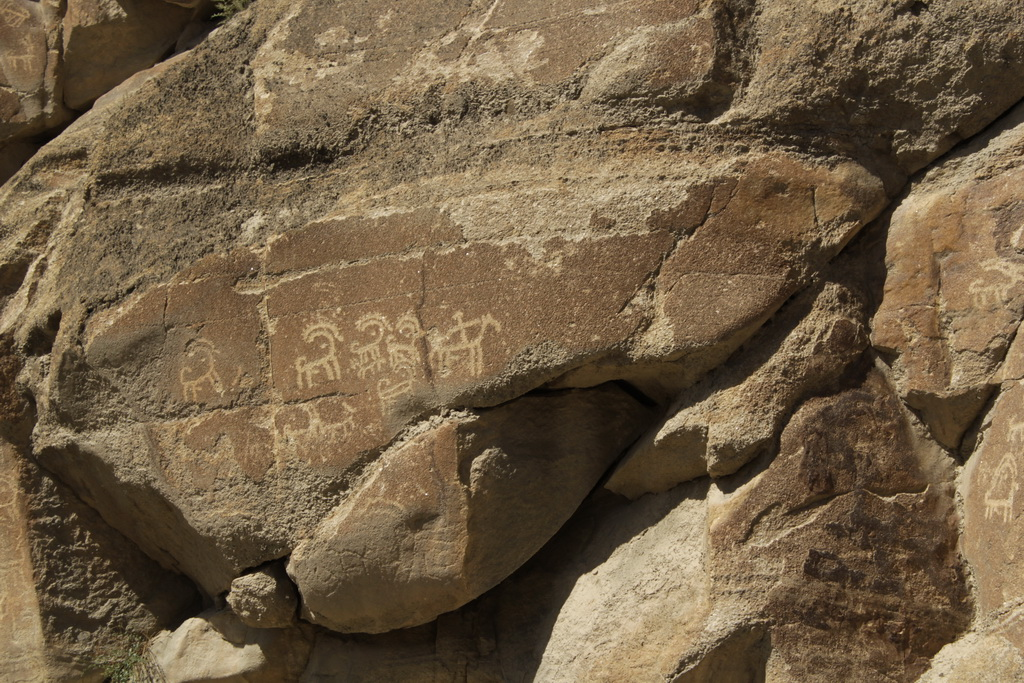
- One of the sacred rocks of Hunza

- Location within South Asia Location within Pakistan Location within Gilgit Baltistan
- 36.3131816°N 74.6860350°E
- Location: Hunza, Gilgit-Baltistan, Pakistan

History
- Formed: 1st Millennium AD

Site notes
- Area: Gilgit-Baltistan
- Restored by: Government of Pakistan
- Owner: Commissioner of Northern Areas, Director of Archaeology, Government of Pakistan

The Sacred Rocks of Hunza or Haldeikish constitute one of the earliest sites of petroglyphs along the ancient Silk Route. It is a cultural heritage site in Gilgit-Baltistan region of northern Pakistan. The carvings on the rocks date back to the 1st Millennium AD.

The rock is situated on top of a hill which lies to the east of the Hunza River. The site is located on the main Karakoram Highway (KKH), positioned between the Ganish village and the Attabad Lake. In times past, it was accessible via well-worn stone steps and harbored a collection of Buddhist cave shelters. However, due to the harsh weather conditions and the passage of time in this mountainous area, many of these shelters have deteriorated, leaving only a few preserved examples. The rocks are one of the major tourist attractions in Gilgit-Baltistan, Pakistan.

== Location ==
The Sacred Rocks (Haldeikish) are situated between the Hunza River and the Karakorum Highway and a five minutes drive from the UNESCO enlisted village of Ganish, near the town of Karimabad in Hunza Valley. The rock is 180 metres in length and 9 metres at their highest point. It consists of four main boulders with two stages/portions of rock engravings and carvings. It is easily accessible from the Karakoram Highway, the metalled road connecting Pakistan to China. It is an isolated rock which is further divided into two portions.

== Haldeikish ==
The name Haldeikish translates to ‘a place of many male Ibex’, with engravings of Ibex scattered along the rock faces, a message to all travellers that wild Ibex were plentiful in this area.

Haldeikish has thousands of petroglyphs in Bactrian, Sogdian, Kharoshti, Tibetan, Chinese and Brahmi written by the Silk Route's 'many' travelers. These petroglyphs show the diverse cultural exchange that once passed through the Hunza region and helped us to understand the history of this entire region from the first millennium CE.

== Specifications ==
The Sacred Rock is divided into two portions, an upper portion and a lower one. Both the portions carry carvings on them which are basically inscriptions and images from Pre-Historic era. There used to be many Buddhist shelter caves in ancient times which later collapsed or fell over the time only some being preserved.

=== Upper Portion ===
The upper portion of the rock consist of inscriptions which are carved in Sogdian, Kharosthi, Brahmi, Sarada and Proto Sarada scripts. The names of the Emperors of the Kushan Empire Kanishka and Huvishka appear in these inscriptions. The name of the Trukha King Ramadusa is also mentioned in inscriptions which are carved in the Brahmi script.

=== Lower Portion ===
The lower portion is engraved by the images of Ibexes. These ibexes are shown in different situations, including being hunted. The carvings also contain Horned-Human deities playing with the ibexes. The carvings of the Ibexes are a proof of the ibex being an animal which holds cultural importance to Buddhists as well as to the region in ancient times. One of the carvings also shows the image of an ancient Chinese King. Some carvings show a Tibetan styled Stupa.

=== Inscription mentioning Chandragupta II ===
The inscription mentioning Chandragupta II of Gupta empire reads ''Chandra Sri Vikramaditya conquers’' with a date corresponding to 419 AD. If Chandra is identified with Chandragupta, it appears that Chandragupta marched through the Hunza. The Sanskrit inscriptions at the Sacred Rock of Hunza, written in Brahmi script, mention the name Chandra. A few of these inscriptions also mention the name Harishena, and one particular inscription mentions Chandra with the epithet "Vikramaditya".

== Preservation ==
The Sacred Rock of Hunza is a Cultural Heritage Site of Pakistan and is currently well preserved but still some the carvings carrying inscriptions are effected due to aging. There were many Buddhist shelter caves which fell over time and only few being preserved. Commissioner of Northern Areas of Pakistan and Director of Archaeology are responsible for the preservation of the site, both acting under the Government of Pakistan. Due to recent flooding in Hunza River the site faces extreme danger in future.

== See also ==
- List of forts in Pakistan
- List of museums in Pakistan
