= Sanchi inscription of Chandragupta II =

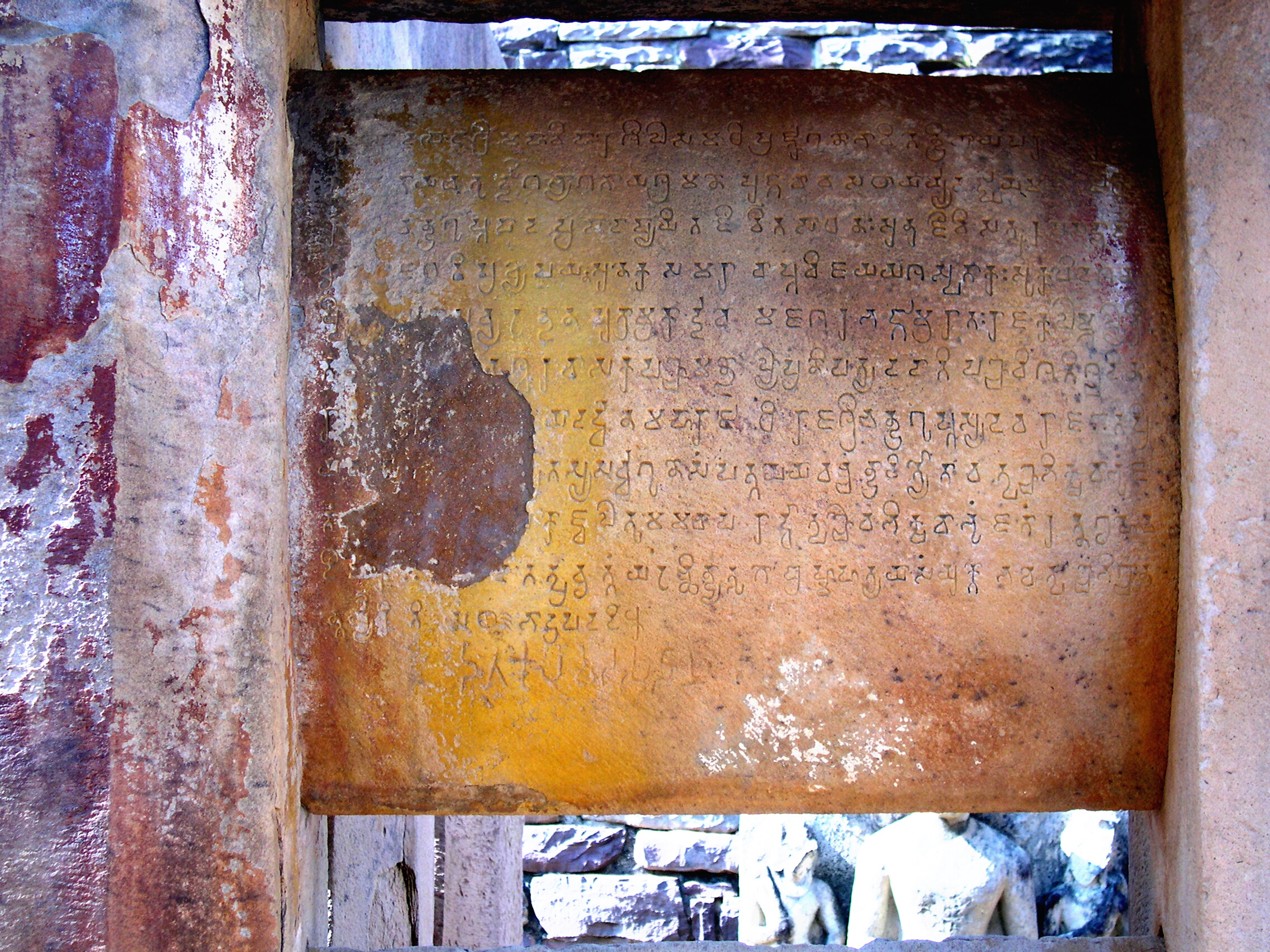
- The inscription of Gupta ruler Chandragupta II at Sanchi.
- Material: Stone
- Created: circa 375–415 CE
- Present location: Sanchi, Raisen, India

The Sanchi inscription of Chandragupta II is an epigraphic record documenting a donation to the Buddhist establishment at Sanchi in the reign of king Chandragupta II (circa CE 375–415). It is dated year 93 in the Gupta era.

== Location ==
Sanchi is located in Raisen District, Madhya Pradesh, India. The inscription is in situ on railing of the main stūpa, to the immediate left of the eastern gate.

== Publication ==
After early notices in the time of James Prinsep, the inscription was published by John Faithfull Fleet in 1888. For later editions and translations, see The South Asia Inscriptions Database.

== Historical significance ==
The inscription is important for the history of Sanchi because it was added to the outer railing, a part of the monument generally dated to circa 100 BCE. It therefore registers a donation to a religious site that was at least five centuries old when the gift was made. The historical significance of the inscription as a document of inter-religious tolerance has been explored by Hans T. Bakker.

== Text ==
The text is in Sanskrit and available through The South Asia Inscriptions Database, see external links.

== Translation ==
"Perfection has been attained! To the community of the faithful in the holy great vihâra of Kâkanâdabôta, -in which the organs of sense (of the members of it) have been subdued by the virtues of (good) character, religious meditation, and wisdom; which . . . . . . . . . . . . deeds of the very highest religious merit; which has come together from the four quarters of the world; (and) which is the abode of most excellent Shramanas,-having prostrated himself in an assembly of five persons, Amrakârdava the son of Undâna,-whose means of subsistence have been made comfortable by the favour of the feet of the Mahârâjâdhirâja, the glorious Chandragupta (II.); who is publishing in the world the amiable behaviour of the virtuous people who are the dependents (of the king); who has acquired banners of victory and fame in many battles; (and) who is an inhabitant of (the town of) Nashtî . . . . . . in the Sukuli dêsha,-gives (the village or allotment of) Îshvaravâsaka ……..purchased with the endowment of Maja and Sharabhanga and Amrarâta of the royal household, and (also gives) twenty-five dînâras.
(Line 7.)-From [the interest of the dînâras] given by him,- with half, as long as the moon and the sun (endure), let five Bhikshus be fed, and let a lamp burn in the jewel-house, for the perfection of all the virtues of….the familiar name of Dêvarâja, ……. Of the Mahârâjâdhirâja, the glorious Chandragupta (II.); and with the other half, which is mine, let the same number of five Bhikshus be fed, and (let) a lamp (burn) in the jewel-house.

(L. 10.)-Whosoever shall interfere with this his arrangement,- he shall become invested with (the guilt of) the slaughter of a cow or of a Brâhman, and with (the guilt of) the five sins that entail immediate retribution!
(L. 11.)-The year 90 (and) 3; (the month) Bhâdrapada; the day 4.

— Sanchi inscription of Chandragupta II

== See also ==
- Indian inscriptions
