= Govindagupta =

4th-5th century Gupta prince of India

Govinda Gupta
- Maharaja
- Born: 4th century
- Died: 5th century
- Dynasty: Gupta
- Father: Chandragupta II
- Mother: Dhruvadevi
- Religion: Hinduism

Govinda Gupta (fl. 4th-5th century) was a Gupta prince of ancient India. He was a son of Chandragupta II and Dhruvadevi, and a brother of Kumaragupta.

Both Chandragupta and Kumaragupta held the Gupta thrones at different times. The Basarh clay seal of Govinda Gupta describes him as a Maharaja ("great king"), and the Mandsaur inscription of his son describes him as a powerful man who destroyed several kings. This has led some historians to theorize that Govinda Gupta also held the Gupta throne for a brief period. However, the general view among modern historians is that Govinda Gupta was never a sovereign ruler: he may have been a governor of the Tirabhukti province within the Gupta empire.

== Sources of information ==
=== Basarh clay seal ===
According to a clay seal discovered at Basarh, among the ruins of the ancient Vaishali city, Govindagupta was a son of the Gupta emperor Chandragupta II and his wife Dhruva-devi. The clay seal names queen Dhruva-svamini (presumably same as Dhruva-devi) as the wife of Maharajadhiraja ("king of great kings") Chandragupta, and the mother of Maharaja ("great king") Govindagupta.

In his Basarh clay seal, Govindagupta is styled Maharaja. No coins issued by Govindagupta have been found, and the Gupta genealogy does not mention him.

=== Mandsaur inscription ===
An inscription discovered in Mandsaur, issued by a son of Govindagupta, eulogizes Govindagupta. The inscription is dated to the year 467 CE of the Malava era (c. 467 CE).

The inscription claims that the kings destroyed by him bowed their heads at his feet, and even Indra - the king of gods in Hindu mythology - was afraid of him. It states Govindagupta was as famous as the god Govinda (Vishnu), and resembled the sons of Diti and Aditi (in Hindu mythology, Diti is the mother of the Daityas or the demons, and Aditi is the mother of the gods; the poet apparently meant to compare Govindagupta to the demons in physical strength, and to the gods in spiritual virtues).

=== Deogarh inscription ===
An inscription discovered on a pillar in the courtyard of the Dashavatara Temple, Deogarh contains the phrase Keshavapura-svami-padaya Bhagavata Govindasya danam. Scholar V. S. Agarwala interprets this phrase to mean that the temple was commissioned by Govindagupta.

== Political status ==
According to the official genealogy of the Gupta dynasty, Chandragupta II was succeeded by his son Kumaragupta. However, the Basarh clay seal describes the Gupta queen Dhruvasvamini as the mother of Maharaja Govindagupta, and does not mention her other son, Kumaragupta. It appears that Govindagupta was the governor of the Tira-bhukti province centered around Vaishali, where he and her mother lived. This may explain why in that area, the queen was known as the mother of Govindagupta rather than that of Kumaragupta. An alternative explanation is that Govindagupta may have been the heir apparent.

Historian D. R. Bhandarkar interpreted the Basarh seal to theorize that Govindagupta was the heir apparent of Chandragupta, and ruled for a short period between 411 CE (the last known date of Chandragupta) and 414 CE (the earliest known date of Kumaragupta). Although Bhandarkar later gave up this theory, it was revived by other scholars after the discovery of the Mandsaur inscription. The inscription describes Govindagupta as a general who ruled in the past, and suggests that he was a powerful king.

Historian B. P. Sinha theorizes that during the later years of Chandragupta, Govindagupta was transferred to Central India, where he was appointed as the governor of the western Malwa region.

The various theories about his political status include:

- Govindagupta was not an independent ruler: the eulogistic description contained in the Mandsaur inscription does not necessarily imply that he was a sovereign ruler. He may have held a high post, such as that of a governor, or may have acted as a regent during Kumaragupta's old age.
- Govindagupta was the heir apparent, but he died before his father, because of which Kumaragupta - who was the next in line of succession - became the new king.
- Historian S. Krishnaswami Aiyangar theorized that Kumaragupta was the heir apparent, and was originally assigned to govern Vaishali; however, in his absence, the post was assigned to Govindagupta, whose mother acted as a regent because he was a minor.
- Govindagupta rebelled against Kumaragupta or his successor Skandagupta, and set up an independent kingdom for a brief period. For example, he may have seized the throne when Skandagupta left the capital to fight against the Hunas. Govindagupta's independent kingdom may have been located in the western Malwa region.
- According to numismatist P. L. Gupta, Govindagupta succeeded his father on the throne, and may have been overthrown by his brother Kumaragupta. Chandragupta's last known date is the c. 412-413 CE (Gupta year 93) and Kumaragupta's last known date is 415 CE (Bilsad inscription of Gupta year 96). So, Govindagupta may have held the throne during 413-415 CE.
- Bhandarkar later theorized that Govindagupta and Kumaragupta were two different names of the same king. This second theory was based on some of Kumaragupta's coins which bear a symbol that seems to read "go": according to Bhandarkar, "go" stands for Govindagupta. Historian R. C. Majumdar dismisses this as weak evidence, pointing out that this symbol also occurs on the coins of Narasimhagupta.

The general view among modern historians is that Govindagupta was a younger brother of Kumaragupta: he was never the heir apparent, and did not ascend the Gupta throne.
