= Virasena Saba =

4th-century Chief Minister of the Gupta Empire

Virasena Saba was the chief minister of the Gupta emperor Chandragupta II. He was also the foreign affairs, peace and war minister. He was the emperor's favourite minister and an accomplished poet. He is known from an Udaygiri cave undated inscription, which records the excavation of a cave temple dedicated to Shiva. He was an ardent Shaivite.

== Name ==
The first part of his name is Vira, which means 'brave', and the second is Sena, the whole name literally meaning 'one with a brave array'.

== Life ==
Virasena Saba was the foreign affairs, peace and war minister of the Gupta emperor Chandragupta II, and held the office by hereditary right. He was the emperor's favourite minister and an accomplished poet.

- (Inscription No. 6, L.4) : Hailing from Pataliputra he was Chandragupta II's (320 - 335 AD) minister for peace and war by hereditary right and accompanied the king on his far-reaching military expeditions.

Pāṇini refers to Senānta names in his Astadhyayi. U.N. Roy conjectures the possibility of the composition of the Prasasti inscribed on the Meharauli Iron Pillar Inscription by Śāba alias Virasena who was an accomplished poet. It is possible that he outlived his patron and when during a Dharmayatra he revisited the spot where the lofty banner had been raised as a mark of homage to Lord Vishnu after the victory over the Vahlikas, was moved to compose and inscribe this Prasasti on the Mehrauli Pillar.
