= Harisena =

4th-century Sanskrit poet

- Occupation: poet

Harisena was a 4th-century Sanskrit poet, panegyrist and a court official. He was an important figure in the court of Gupta emperor, Samudragupta. His most famous poem, written c. 345 C.E., describes the bravery of Samudragupta and is inscribed on the Allahabad Pillar. At least one of his known inscriptions was written as a panegyric.

Harisena was an early writer of Kāvya poetry; Arthur Berriedale Keith says of it, "Harisena's poem bears expressly the title Kavya, though it consists both of prose and verse. Its structure is similar to the delineation of kings adopted in the prose romances of Subandhu and Bana". Other works attributed to either this author (or others by the same name) includes Apabramsa Dharmapariksa, Karpuraprakara (Suktavall), the medical treatise Jagatsundari-Yogamaladhikara, Yasodharacanta, Astahnikakatha and Brhatkathakosa. He was also the chief minister of Samudragupta's empire. Harishena had a great interest in playing the lute with his friend Samudragupta. Harishena had also played an important role in the marriage of Samudragupta with Dattadevi.
