= Supiya =

Supiya Supia
- village
- Location within Madhya Pradesh Location within India
- Coordinates: 24.4279°N 81.4004°E
- Country: India
- State: Madhya Pradesh
- District: Rewa
- Block: Rewa

Area
  - Total: 4.77 km^{2} (1.84 sq mi)

Population (2011)
  - Total: 1,572
  - Density: 330/km^{2} (854/sq mi)
- Time zone: UTC+5:30 (IST)
- Postal Index Number: 486550
- STD code: 07662
- ISO 3166 code: MP-IN
- Vehicle registration: MP-

Supiya (also spelled Supia) is a village in the Rewa district of Madhya Pradesh, India.

== Demographics ==
According to the 2011 census of India, it has 386 households with 1,572 people (828 males and 744 females). Out of these, 1,033 people are literate. The population includes 187 people belonging to Scheduled Castes and 239 people belonging to Scheduled Tribes.

== Archaeology ==
A 460 CE pillar inscription of the Gupta king Skandagupta has been discovered at Supiya.
