= Basarh =

- village
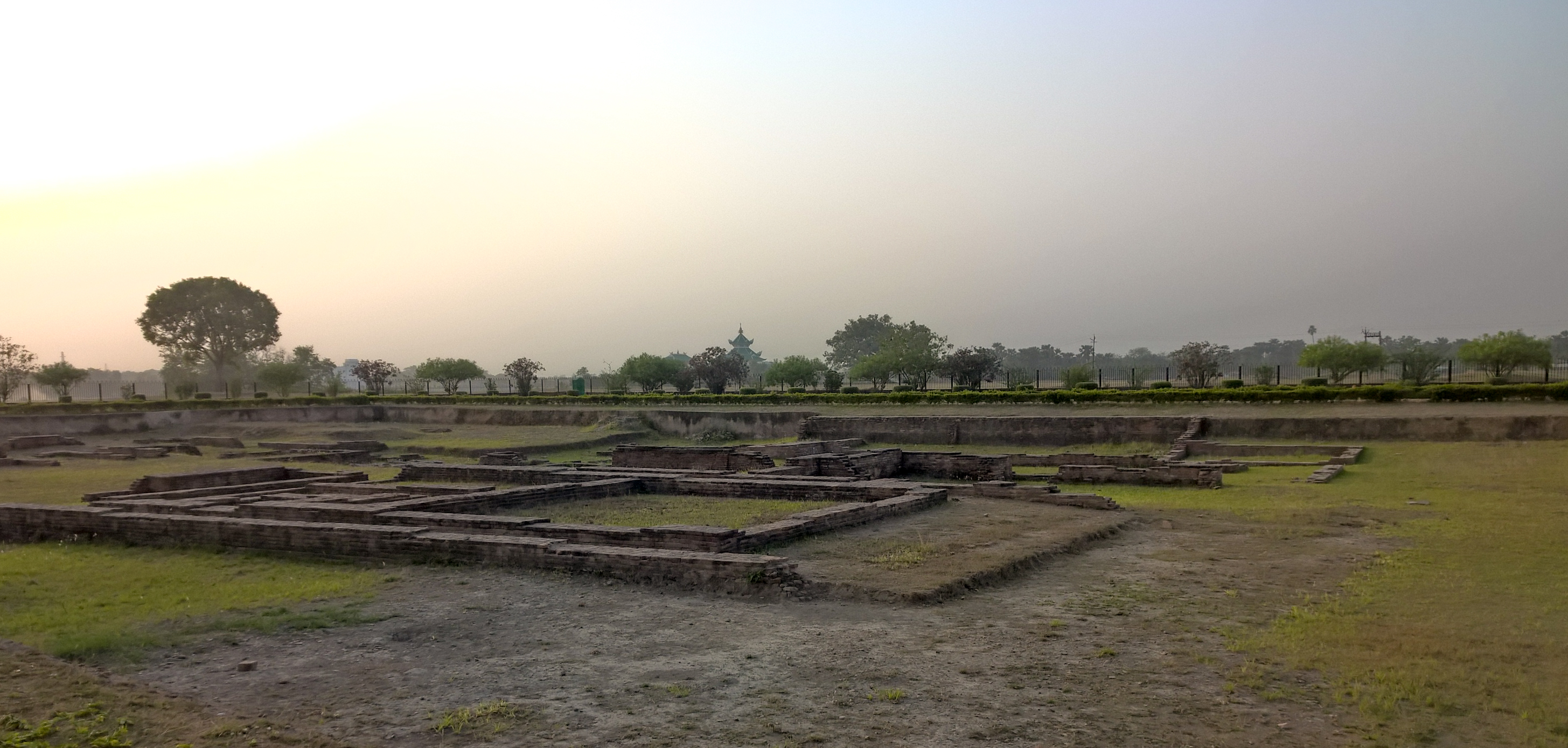
- Ruins of the ancient fort at Basarh

- Location within Bihar Location within India
- Coordinates: 25.97729°N 85.13231°E
- Country: India
- State: Bihar
- District: Vaishali
- Block: Vaishali

Area
  - Total: 10.01 km^{2} (3.86 sq mi)

Population (2011)
  - Total: 14,084
  - Density: 1,407/km^{2} (3,644/sq mi)
- Time zone: UTC+5:30 (IST)
- Postal Index Number: 844128
- STD code: 06223
- ISO 3166 code: BR-IN
- Vehicle registration: BR-

Basarh is a village in the Vaishali district of Bihar, India. It is the location of the ancient Vaishali city.

According to the 2011 census of India, Basarh has 14,084 people in 2,667 households. The population includes 7,289 males and 6,795 females. The effective literacy rate (that is, literacy rate of the population aged 6 years and above) of the village is 56.84%. The area of the village is 10.01 km^{2}.

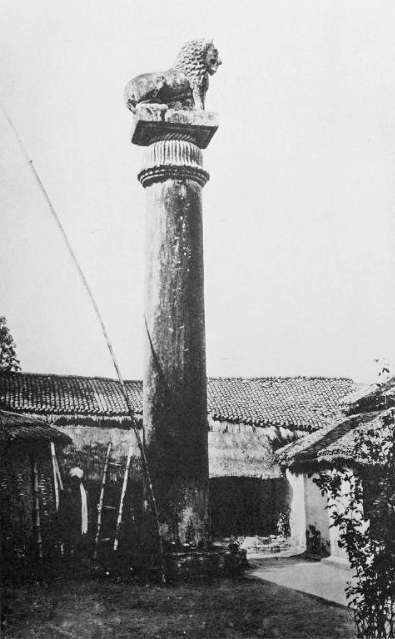
The Basarh lion pillar
