= Ariaca =

Ariaca (Ancient Greek: Ἀριακὴ or Ἀριακὴ Σαδινῶν) was a region of Western India beyond Barigaza, mentioned in ancient geographical sources, usually associated with the Western Satraps.

According to the Periplus of the Erythraean Sea, Ariaca was part of the kingdom of Nambanus, thought to be the Western Satrap ruler Nahapana:

41. "Beyond the gulf of Baraca is that of Barygaza and the coast of the country of Ariaca, which is the beginning of the Kingdom of Nambanus and of all India. That part of it lying inland and adjoining Scythia is called Abiria, but the coast is called Syrastrene. It is a fertile country, yielding wheat and rice and sesame oil and clarified butter, cotton and the Indian cloths made therefrom, of the coarser sorts. Very many cattle are pastured there, and the men are of great stature and black in color. The metropolis of this country is Minnagara, from which much cotton cloth is brought down to Barygaza."

— Periplus of the Erythraean Sea, Chap. 41

Ptolemy further describes Ariaca as being composed of the cities of Suppara (Sopara), Dunga, Symilla emporium (Chaul), Balepatna, Hippocura (the seat of the palace of a king, whom Ptolemy calls Baleocarus), ending before the city of Mandagora.
