= Ryszard Wołągiewicz =

Polish archaeologist

- Born: 19 June 1933; Vilnius, Poland
- Died: 14 January 1994 (aged 60); Szczecin, Poland

Academic background
- Education: Adam Mickiewicz University in Poznań

Academic work
- Institutions: National Museum, Szczecin
- Main interests: Pre-Roman Iron Age and Roman Iron Age in East-Central Europe

Ryszard Wołągiewicz (19 June 1933 – 14 January 1994) was a Polish archaeologist. He was director of National Museum, Szczecin for many years and a well known specialist on the Pre-Roman Iron Age and Roman Iron Age in East-Central Europe.

== Biography ==
Ryszard Wołągiewicz was born in Vilnius on 19 June 1933. His father Fabian Wołągiewicz (1908–1940) was murdered in the Katyn massacre along with other prominent male members of the family, and in June 1940 Ryszard and his mother and brother were deported by the Soviet Union to the Komi Republic. They returned to Poland in 1946, and Wołągiewicz graduated from high school in Choszczno in 1952.

In 1952, Wołągiewicz started studying archaeology at the Adam Mickiewicz University in Poznań, gaining his MA in 1956 with a thesis on the Hallstatt culture. He subsequently worked at the National Museum, Szczecin, and was appointed director in 1980. The research of Wołągiewicz centered on the Pre-Roman Iron Age and Roman Iron Age in East-Central Europe. He was the author of many publications on these subjects. He gained a PhD in 1993 with a thesis on the ceramics of the Wielbark culture.

Wołągiewicz died in Szczecin on 14 January 1994. The museum Muzeum Ziemi Choszczeńskiej, founded in 1994, is dedicated to Wołągiewicz.

== Selected works ==
- Uwagi do zagadnienia stosunków kulturowych w okresie lateńskim na Pomorzu Zachodnim, „Materiały Zachodnio-Pomorskie", t. V, 1959.
- Oblicze kulturowe osadnictwa Pomorza Zachodniego u progu naszej ery, „Munera archaeologica Iosepho Kostrzewski (...)", Poznań 1963.
- Uzbrojenie ludności Pomorza Zachodniego u progu naszej ery „Materiały Zachodnio-Pomorskie", t. IX, 1963 (z żoną Marią Danutą).
- Napływ importów rzymskich do Europy na północ od środkowego Dunaju, „Archeologia Polski", t. 15, 1970.
- Kręgi kamienne w Grzybnicy, Koszalin 1977.
- kilka rozdziałów w pracy zbiorowej Prahistoria Ziem Polskich, tom V, 1981.
- Ceramika kultury wielbarskiej między Bałtykiem a Morzem Czarnym, Szczecin 1993.

== See also ==
- Andrzej Kokowski
- Mark Shchukin
- Marek Olędzki
- Jerzy Kolendo
- Anders Kaliff
- Michel Kazanski
- Kazimierz Godłowski

== Sources ==
- "Henryk Machajewski, Pamięci doktora Ryszarda Wołągiewicza, "Folia Praehistorica Posnaniensia", t. 7, 1995, s. 361–369" (PDF).
- Brzustowicz B., Brzustowicz G., 1996, Inauguracha Muzeum Ziemi Choszczeńskiej, „Nadwarciański Rocznik Historyczno-Archiwalny”, t. 3, s. 250–255.
