= Godłowski =

Godłowski (feminine: Godłowska; plural: Godłowscy) is a Polish surname. Notable people with this surname include:

- Kazimierz Godłowski (1934–1995), Polish archeologist
- Włodzimierz Godłowski (1900–1940), Polish neurologist and psychologist
