= Marek Olędzki =

Polish archaeologist (born 1951)

- Born: 25 April 1951 (age 75); Łódź, Poland

Academic background
- Education: University of Łódź; Adam Mickiewicz University in Poznań
- Thesis: Kultura przeworska na południe od Karpat (1999)
- Doctoral advisor: Jerzy Stanisław Kmieciński

Academic work
- Institutions: University of Łódź
- Main interests: Pre-Roman Iron Age and Roman Iron Age in East-Central Europe

Marek Olędzki (born 25 April 1951) is a Polish archaeologist who is Head of the Department of Prehistory at the University of Łódź.

== Biography ==
Marek Olędzki was born in Łódź, Poland on 25 April 1951. Upon graduating from high school in Łódź in 1969, Olędzki studied law at the University of Łódź. He subsequently switched to archaeology, and gained his M.A. in archaeology from the University of Łódź in 1979. He subsequently worked as a researcher at the Polish Academy of Sciences under the supervision of Andrzej Nadolski. Olędzki gained his Ph.D. at the Adam Mickiewicz University in Poznań in 1999 under the supervision of Jerzy Stanisław Kmieciński. His dissertation was on the Przeworsk culture.

Upon gaining his Ph.D., Olędzki became employed at the University of Łódź, where he completed his habilitation in 2009. Olędzki was subsequently appointed a Professor at the University of Łódź. Since October 2017, Olędzki has been Head of the Department of Prehistory at the University of Łódź.

Olędzki primarily researches the Pre-Roman Iron Age and Roman Iron Age. He specializes in the study of the relationship between the Roman Empire and barbarians, particularly their military relationship. He is the author of more than 120 publications on these subjects.

== Selected works ==
- (with T. J. Horbacz), Roman Inlaid Swords, „Journal of Roman Military Equipment Studies“, vol. 9, 1998, p. 19 - 30. 40.
- Rollenkappenfibeln der östlichen Hauptserie Almgren 37-41 und die Varianten Fig. 42-43, [in:] 100 Jahre Fibelformen nach Oscar Almgren, (red. J. Kunow), „Forschungen zur Archäologie im Land Brandenburg”, vol. 5, 1998, p. 67 - 84.
- Cmentarzysko z młodszego okresu przedrzymskiego i okresu rzymskiego w Wólce Domaniowskiej koło Radomia, 2000
- Czas przemian. Barbaricum między Bałtykiem a środkowym Dunajem w dobie wojen markomańskich, 2008
- Wojny markomańskie 162 – 185 n.e., 2011
- Marcomanni and Quadi in the System of Client „States” of the Roman Empire, “Ephemeris Napocensis”, vol. XXV, 2016, p. 95-104.
- (with L. Tyszler), Models of military equipment of the Przeworsk culture warriors in the Bzura River basin, Študijné zvesti Archeologického Ústavu Slovenskej Akadémie Vied, vol. 62, Nitra 2017, p. 149 – 169.
- Latkowo 50, gm. Inowrocław. Cmentarzysko szkieletowe z późnego okresu rzymskiego, 2018
- The Tribal World of the Germanic Peoples, 2020

== See also ==
- Andrzej Kokowski
- Mark Shchukin
- Ryszard Wołągiewicz
- Jerzy Kolendo
- Kazimierz Godłowski
