= Chashtana =

Kardamaka ruler from 78 CE to 130

- Mahakshatrapa Bhadramukha Swami
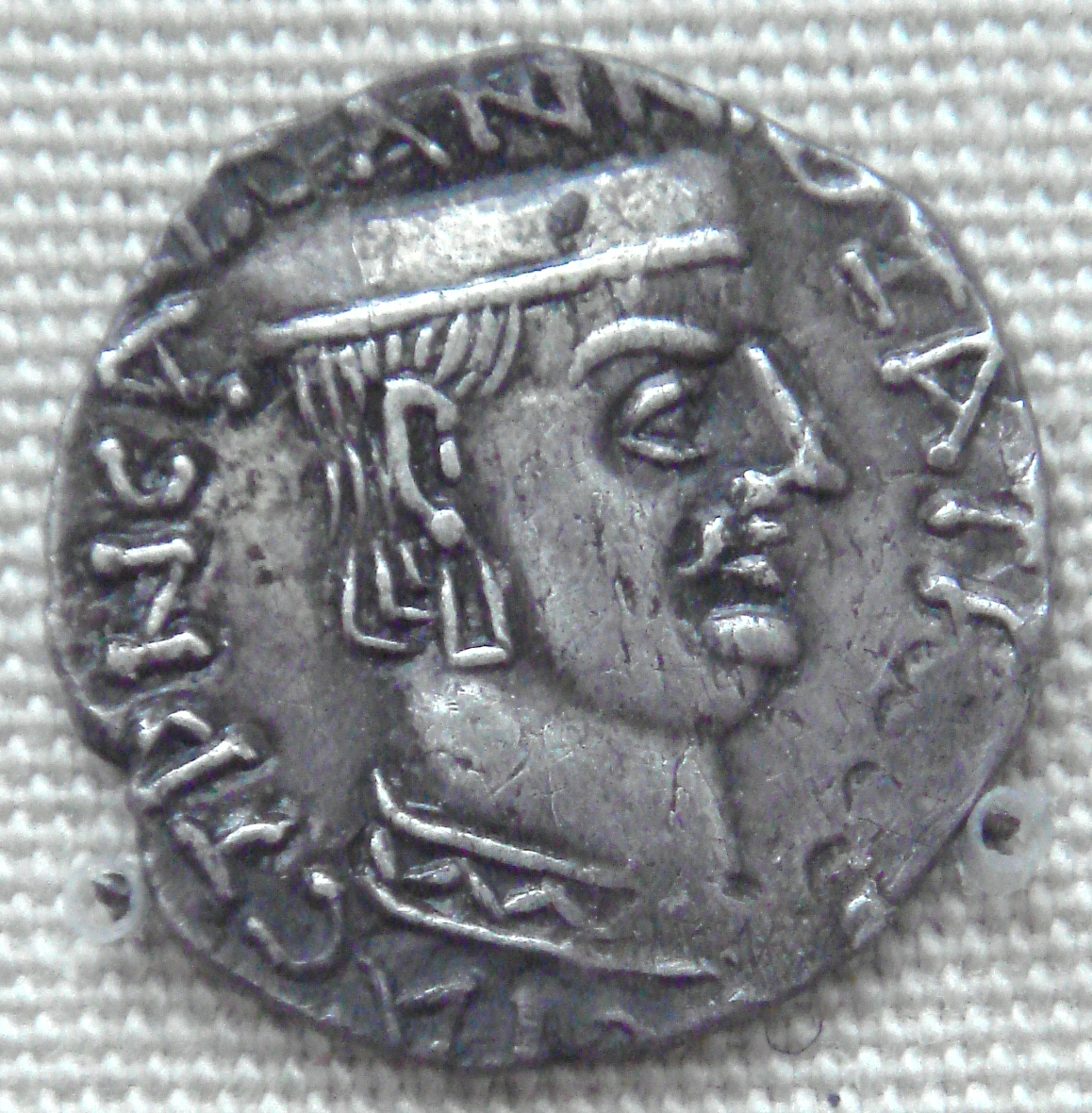
- Silver coin of Chashtana, with ruler profile and Greek script legend ΡΑΝΝΙω ΙΑΤΡΑΠΑϹ ϹΙΑϹΤΑΝϹΑ. British Museum.

King of Western Kshatrapas
- Reign: 78–130 CE
- Predecessor: Nahapana
- Successor: Jayadaman

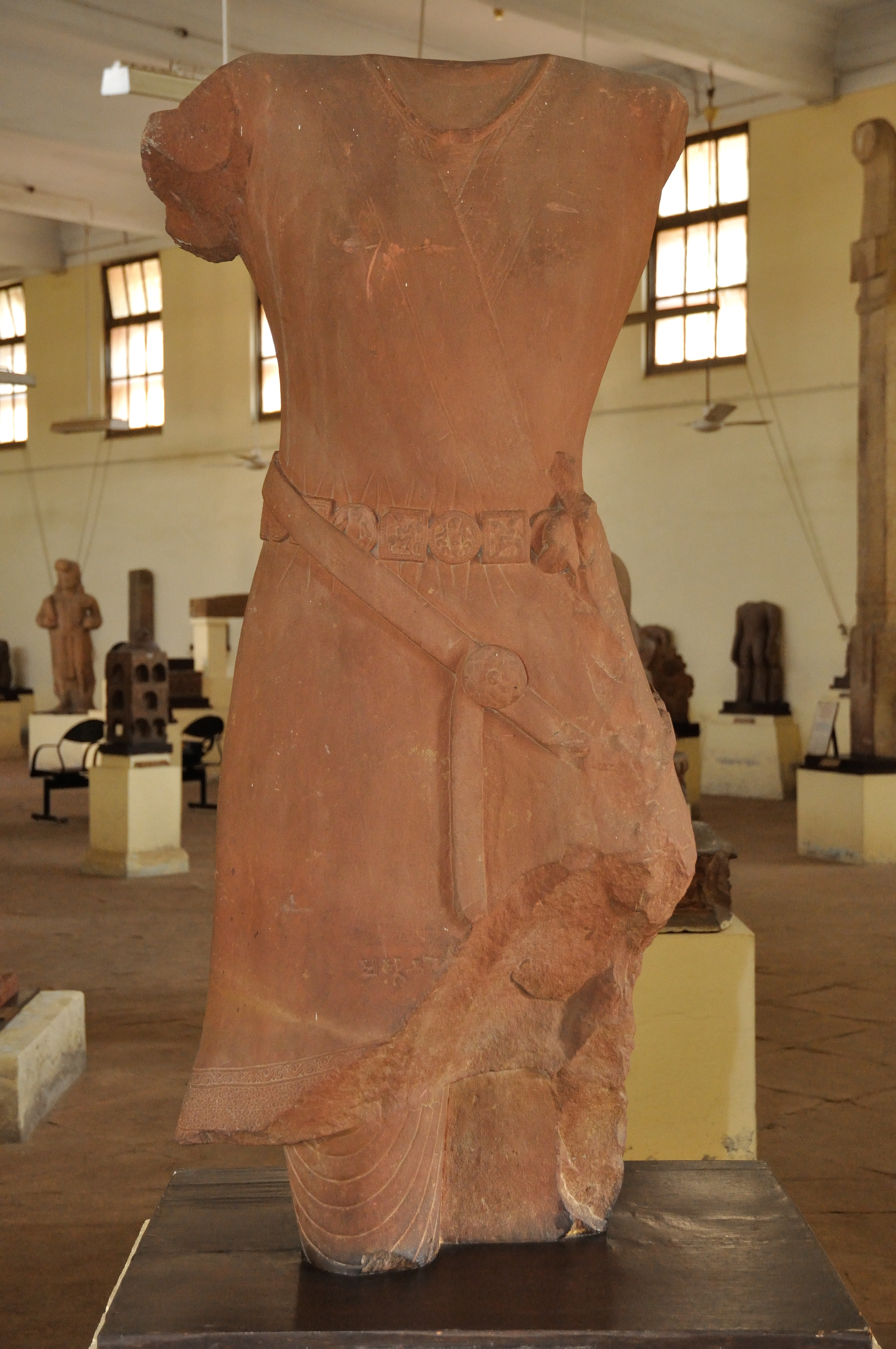
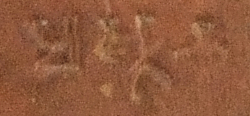
Inscribed statue of Saka King Chastana, with inscription "Shastana" (Middle Brahmi script: Sha-sta-na). Kushan Period.

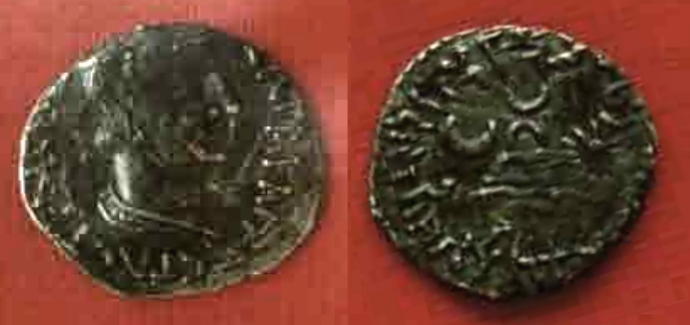
Coin of Chastana, found in Junagadh.

Chashtana (Greek: Ϲιαϲτανϲας Siastansas (epigraphic), Τιαστανης Tiastanēs; Brahmi: Ca-ṣṭa-na Caṣṭana; Kharosthi: 𐨖𐨛𐨞 Cha-ṭha-ṇa, Chaṭhaṇa) was a ruler of the Saka Western Satraps in northwestern India during 78-130 CE, when he was the satrap of Ujjain.

== Name ==
Chashtana's name is attested in the Greek forms Siastansas (Ϲιαϲτανϲας) and Tiastanēs (Τιαστανης), in the Brahmi form Caṣṭana and the Kharosthi form Chaṭhaṇa (𐨖𐨛𐨞), which are derived from the Saka name *Caṣṭana, meaning "master".

== Reign ==
Among modern scholars, the beginning of the Saka era is widely equated to the ascension of Chashtana (possibly to Mahakshatrapa) in 78 CE.

A statue found in Mathura together with statues of the Kushan king Kanishka and Vima Taktu, and bearing the name "Shastana" (Middle Brahmi script of the Kushan period: Ṣa-sta-na) is often attributed to Chashtana himself. Chashtana is called Tisman by the bards, a spelling that matches the Greek rendition of his name more closely.

Chashtana was mentioned by Ptolemy as Tiastanēs, ruling a large area of Western India into the 2nd century CE, especially the area of Ujjain ("Ozene"), during the reign of the Satavahana king Vasisthiputra Sri Pulamavi. According to Ptolemy, Chashtana directly ruled Ujjain, while Paithan (Pratisthana) continued to be ruled by Siristolemaios (identified with Sri Pulumayi, son of Gautamiputra Satakarni). Ptolemy in his "Geographia", where he classifies the Western Satraps as "Indo-Scythians", describes Chashtana's territory as starting from Patalene in the West, to his capital Ujjain in the east ("Ozena-Regia Tiastani", "Ozene, capital of king Chashtana"), and beyond Barigaza in the south:

Moreover the region which is next to the western part of India, is called Indoscythia. A part of this region around the (Indus) river mouth is Patalena, above which is Abiria. That which is about the mouth of the Indus and the Canthicolpus bay is called Syrastrena. (...) In the island formed by this river are the cities Pantala, Barbaria. (...) The Larica region of Indoscythia is located eastward from the swamp near the sea, in which on the west of the Namadus river is the interior city of Barygaza emporium. On the east side of the river (...) Ozena-Regia Tiastani (...) Minagara".

— Ptolemy Geographia, Book Seven, Chapter I

Chashtana was the grandfather of the great Western Satrap conqueror Rudradaman I. Chashtana was founder of one of the two major Saka Satrap dynasties in north-western India, the Kardamaka (Bhadramukhas); the other, short-lived dynasty, the Kshaharatas ("Satraps"), included Bhumaka and Nahapana.

== Coinage ==
The coinage of Chastana combines a corrupted Greek legend on the obverse, around his portrait, and a Brahmi script legend on the reverse around a "Three hills and river" symbol together with the sun and two moons.

Obverse: The obverse in Greek corrupted script typically reads "ΡΑΝΝΙω ΙΑΤΡΑΠAC CIASTANCA", transliteration of the Prakrit Raño Kshatrapasa Chashtana: "King and Satrap Chashtana".
Reverse: The reverse in Early/Middle Brahmi script reads: RAJNO MAHAKSHATRAPASA YSAMOTIKAPUTRASA CHASHTANASA "Of the Rajah, the Great Satrap, son of Ysamotika, Chashtana". This legend is sometimes followed by the name "Chatḥaṇasa" in Kharosthi script.

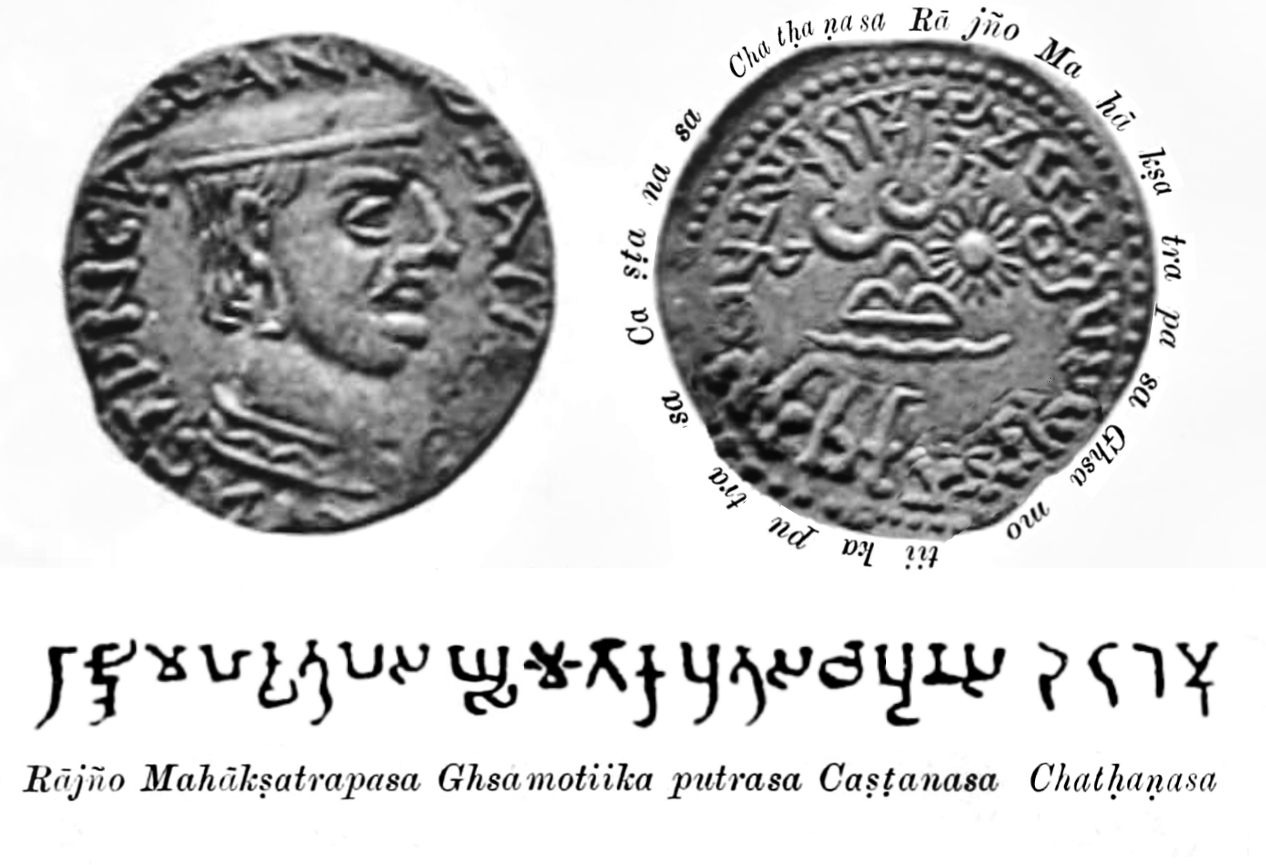
Coinage of Chastana with complete reverse legend in Brahmi, with a repetition of the name of the ruler in Kharoshthi: "Of the Rajah, the Great Satrap, son of Ysamotika, Chashtana Chatḥaṇa"

Preceded by Nahapana	Western Satrap; 130 CE	Succeeded by Jayadaman

Territories/ dates	Western India	Western Pakistan Balochistan	Paropamisadae Arachosia	Bajaur	Gandhara	Western Punjab	Eastern Punjab	Mathura
			INDO-GREEK KINGDOM					
90–85 BCE			Nicias	Menander II		Artemidoros		
90–70 BCE			Hermaeus	Archebius				
85-60 BCE			INDO-SCYTHIAN KINGDOM; Maues					
75–70 BCE			Vonones; Spalahores	Telephos		Apollodotus II		
65–55 BCE			Spalirises; Spalagadames			Hippostratos	Dionysios	
55–35 BCE			Azes I				Zoilos II	
55–35 BCE			Azilises; Azes II				Apollophanes	Indo-Scythian dynasty of the NORTHERN SATRAPS; Hagamasha
25 BCE – 10 CE				Indo-Scythian dynasty of the APRACHARAJAS; Vijayamitra (ruled 12 BCE - 15 CE) (Note: From the dated inscription on the Rukhana reliquary)	Liaka Kusulaka; Patika Kusulaka; Zeionises	Kharahostes (ruled 10 BCE– 10 CE) (Note: An Inscribed Silver Buddhist Reliquary of the Time of King Kharaosta and Prince Indravarman, Richard Salomon, Journal of the American Oriental Society, Vol. 116, No. 3 (Jul. - Sep., 1996), pp. 442); Mujatria	Strato II and Strato III	Hagana
10-20 CE		INDO-PARTHIAN KINGDOM; Gondophares		Indravasu	INDO-PARTHIAN KINGDOM; Gondophares		Rajuvula	
20-30 CE			Ubouzanes; Pakores	Vispavarma (ruled c.0-20 CE) (Note: A Kharosthī Reliquary Inscription of the Time of the Apraca Prince Visnuvarma, by Richard Salomon, South Asian Studies 11 1995, Pages 27-32, Published online: 09 Aug 2010)	Sarpedones		Bhadayasa	Sodasa
30-40 CE			KUSHAN EMPIRE; Kujula Kadphises	Indravarma	Abdagases		...	...
40-45 CE				Aspavarma	Gadana		...	...
45-50 CE				Sasan	Sases		...	...
50-75 CE							...	...
75-100 CE	Indo-Scythian dynasty of the WESTERN SATRAPS; Chastana		Vima Takto				...	...
100-120 CE	Abhiraka		Vima Kadphises				...	...
120 CE	Bhumaka; Nahapana	PARATARAJAS; Yolamira	Kanishka I				Great Satrap Kharapallana and Satrap Vanaspara for Kanishka I	
130-230 CE	Jayadaman; Rudradaman I Damajadasri I Jivadaman; Rudrasimha I Satyadaman; Jivadaman; Rudrasena I	Bagamira; Arjuna; Hvaramira; Mirahvara	Vāsishka (c. 140 – c. 160); Huvishka (c. 160 – c. 190); Vasudeva I (c. 190 – to at least 230)					
230-280 CE	Samghadaman; Damasena; Damajadasri II; Viradaman; Isvaradatta; Yasodaman I Vijayasena; Damajadasri III; Rudrasena II; Visvasimha	Miratakhma; Kozana; Bhimarjuna; Koziya; Datarvharna; Datarvharna	INDO-SASANIANS; Ardashir I, Sassanid king and "Kushanshah" (c. 230 – 250); Peroz I, "Kushanshah" (c. 250 – 265); Hormizd I, "Kushanshah" (c. 265 – 295)			Kanishka II (c. 230 – 240); Vashishka (c. 240 – 250); Kanishka III (c. 250 – 275)		
280-300 CE	Bhratadarman	Datayola II	Hormizd II, "Kushanshah" (c. 295 – 300)			Vasudeva II (c. 275 – 310)		
300-320 CE	Visvasena; Rudrasimha II; Jivadaman		Peroz II, "Kushanshah" (c. 300 – 325)			Vasudeva III; Vasudeva IV; Vasudeva V Chhu (c. 310? – 325)		
320-388 CE	Yasodaman II; Rudradaman II; Rudrasena III; Simhasena; Rudrasena IV		Shapur II Sassanid king and "Kushanshah" (c. 325); Varhran I, Varhran II, Varhran III "Kushanshahs" (c. 325 – 350); Peroz III "Kushanshah" (c. 350 –360); HEPHTHALITE/ HUNAS invasions			Shaka I (c. 325 – 345); Kipunada (c. 345 – 375)		GUPTA EMPIRE; Chandragupta I Samudragupta
388-395 CE	Rudrasimha III		Chandragupta II					
