= Abhiraka =

Indo-Scythian king (circa 20 BCE)

- Khaharatasa Khatrapasa
- Reign: c. 35 CE
- Successor: Bhumaka

Abhiraka was a ruler from the Kshaharata dynasty, of the Western Satraps.

== Name ==
Prior to R. C. Senior reading the name as Abhiraka (1998), the name had been misread as Aubhiraka, Aubhirakes, Aghudaka, Arta, and Ata.

== Coinage ==
Coins of Abhiraka have been predominantly from modern-day Gujarat (Saurashtra, Kutch, etc.); one-off specimens have also been found in as far as Afghanistan and Mleiha in the United Arab Emirates, attesting to the antiquity of long-distance trade networks. Only copper mints have been found.

The obverse features a winged Nike, holding a wreath, circumscribed by the Greek legend, ΣAΓAPATOY ΣATPAΠOY AYBIPAKOY; the reverse has a lion / elephant / horse facing a wheel — variably interpreted as the Dharmachakra or Krshna's chakra — (Note: Extant evidence about the religious affiliation of Ksharatas attests to their preference for Buddhism. Liaka Kusalaka and his son commissioned a Buddhist monastery, as did Nahapana. Nonetheless, Joe Cribb links the wheel with the Krishna-Balarama standard; Devendra Handa, too, finds the design to be very similar to the coinage of the Vrishnis — the tribe that Krishna belonged to, according to epical literature.), circumscribed by a Brahmi or Kharoshthi legend, Khaharatasa Khatrapasa Abhirakasa jayatasa Abhirakasa (transl.The Khsaharata Satrap Abhiraka; victory to Abhiraka). (Note: Dev Kumar Jhanjh proposes an alternate reading of "Abhiraka/Of the Abhiras, victorious over the Khaharata Satraps" — that is, Abhiraka was an Abhira King who had defeated the Kshaharatas. However, he ignores coins with the same legend, minted by Hospises, Higaraka, and others who had preceded Abhiraka.)

=== Overstrikes ===
Overstrikes on coins of Apollodotus II are plenty; besides, coins of Apollodotos II (and others) countermarked with the wheel-and-animal motif, are assumed to have been issued by him, by Senior and other numismatists.

== Dating ==
None of the Kshaharata rulers — Yapirajaya, (Note: There is no firm evidence that Yapirajaya was a Kshaharata, except for coinage motifs that were similar to the succeeding Kshaharata satraps.) Higaraka/Higataka, Hospises, Hastadatta, Abhiraka, Bhumaka, and Nahapana — use any date on their coins. The Taxila copper plate, which mentions two other Kshaharatas — Liaka Kusulaka and his son, Patika Kusulaka, both of whose coins are yet to be discovered — was engraved in the 78th year of King Maues, but Maues' regnal span remains uncertain in itself. So, attempts to date the Kshaharatas must rely on circumstantial evidence. Besides, the dynasty appears to have migrated from North to South — while the coins of the latter three rulers are predominantly found in around modern-day Gujarat, the coins of the others are found only further north — and it might have been the case that some of them were contemporaries, ruling across different regions.

Nonetheless, a rough date for Abhiraka might be approached as follows:

- Abhiraka had overstruck as well as countermarked copper mints of Apollodotus II (r. 80–65 BCE) but almost of none else; hence, he must have come after Apollodotus II but not after too long a time since by then, not only would Apollodotus' coppers have not remained in circulation but also coins of other Kings would be available too.
- Abhiraka had countermarked copper mints of one Yapirajaya who had, in turn, likely overstruck a mint of Hospises; thus, both of them seem to have been intermediary rulers between Apollodotus II and Abhiraka, but given the acute scarcity of their coins, probably ruled for short spans.
- Abhiraka's copper mints were overstruck by Bhumaka; hence, Bhumaka must have preceded him but since they carried the same designs on the reverse of their coins, they should have been fairly proximate. Bhumaka is also inscribed in the coins of Nahapana — c. middle of 1st century CE — as his father.

Thus, Abhiraka's regnal period comes out to be c. late 1st century BCE.

== Bibliography ==
- Cribb, Joe (2021). "Greekness after the end of the Bactrian and Indo-Greek kingdoms". In Mairs, Rachel (ed.). The Graeco-Bactrian and Indo-Greek World. London: Routledge. ISBN 978-93-88414-29-6.
- Cribb, Joe (1998). "Western Satraps and Satavahanas: Old and New Ideas of Chronology". In Jha, Amal Kumar (ed.). Ex moneta: Essays on numismatics, history, and archaeology in honour of Dr. David W. MacDowall. Vol. 1. New Delhi: Harman Pub. House. ISBN 8186622284.
- Falk, Harry (2024). "Who blocked the Nāneghāṭ? Refections on Nahapāna, Sandanēs, and the Sātavāhanas". In Klaus, Konrad; Dietz, Siglinde; Fornell, Ines (eds.). Vidyārādhanam: Festschrift zu Ehren von Thomas Oberlies. Berlin: Heidelberg Asian Studies Publishing.
- Falk, Harry (2016). "Two new Kṣaharāta kṣatrapas". Journal of the Oriental Numismatic Society. 227.
- Handa, Devendra (2007). "The Vrishnis". Tribal Coins of Ancient India. New Delhi: Aryan Books International. ISBN 978-8173053177.
- Jhanjh, Dev Kumar (2020). "The Ābhīraka Coin: Search for a New Identity". Art and History: Texts, Contexts and Visual Representations in Ancient and Early Medieval India. Delhi: Bloomsbury India. ISBN 978-93-88414-29-6.
- Senior, R. C. (1999a). "Notes on Ancient Coins". Oriental Numismatic Society Newsletter. 160.
- Senior, R.C. (1999b). Indo-Scythian coins and history. Vol. 1. Classical Numismatic Group.
- Senior, R.C. (2001). Indo-Scythian coins and history. Vol. 2. Classical Numismatic Group.
- Senior, R.C. (2006). Indo-Scythian coins and history. Vol. 4. Classical Numismatic Group.
- Senior, R. C. (2014). "A new coin from the time of the Kshaharata Satraps". Journal of the Oriental Numismatic Society. 218.
