= Roman imperial period (chronology) =

Period in the history of ancient Rome

The Roman imperial period is the expansion of political and cultural influence of the Roman Empire. The period begins with the reign of Augustus (r. 27 BC – AD 14), and it is taken to end variously between the late 3rd and the late 4th century, with the beginning of late antiquity. Despite the end of the "Roman imperial period", the Roman Empire continued to exist under the rule of the Roman emperors into Late Antiquity and beyond, except in the Western Empire, over which the Romans' political and military control was lost in the course of the 5th-century fall of the Western Roman Empire.

== Periodization ==
In historiography, the "imperial period" is by convention taken to last from 27 BCE to CE 284. In archaeology, on the other hand, the term is usually taken to cover the period of c. CE 1 to 375 (the latter being a conventional date for the onset of the Migration Period). This follows Hans Jürgen Eggers (1955), who used a periodization of "early imperial period" (German: frühkaiserzeitlich) B1 to B2 and "late imperial period" (German: spätkaiserzeitlich) C1 to C3, reflecting the history of Roman pottery imports to Magna Germania and other parts of Barbaricum (Eggers A corresponds to La Tène D). In the chronology of Eggers (1955):

| La Tène period | stage | D | C | B | A | | |
| La Tène period | absolute date | 450–380 BCE | 380–250 BCE | 250–150 BCE | 150–15 BCE | | |
| Roman Empire (Barbaricum) period (according to Eggers) | stage | A | B1 | B2 | C1 | C2 | C3 |
| Roman Empire (Barbaricum) period (according to Eggers) | absolute date | 100–1 BCE | 1–30 CE | 30–150 CE | 150–200 CE | 200–300 CE | 300–375 CE |
| Migration period (according to Eggers) | stage | D | | | | | |
| Migration period (according to Eggers) | absolute date | 375–568 CE | | | | | |

The term "Roman imperial period" has been used as opposed to "late antiquity", i.e. implying the "early" and "middle" imperial period of the late 1st century BC to the 3rd century CE. The "Roman imperial period" in this sense would end with the reforms under Diocletian and the beginning of the Christianization of the Roman Empire. The period is roughly equivalent in span to the "Principate", the early period of Roman imperial rule from Augustus to Diocletian (r. 284–305), succeeded by the "Dominate".

== See also ==
- History of the Roman Empire
- List of Roman emperors
- Roman Iron Age
