= Jerzy Kolendo =

Polish historian and archaeologist

- Born: Jerzy Władysław Kolendo; June 9, 1933; Brest-on-the-Bug, Polesie Voivodeship, Second Polish Republic
- Died: February 28, 2014 (aged 80); Warsaw, Masovian Voivodeship, Third Polish Republic
- Resting place: Służew New Cemetery
- Occupation: Academic
- Years active: 1955-2012
- Known for: Archaeology and history of Ancient Rome
- Title: Professor
- Awards: Special Prize of Poland's Council of Ministers (2004); Commander's Cross of the Order of Polonia Restituta (2011)

Academic background
- Education: University of Warsaw
- Thesis: (1960)
- Doctoral advisor: Iza Bieżuńska-Małowist
- Influences: Tadeusz Manteuffel, Aleksander Gieysztor, Fernand Braudel

Academic work
- Discipline: Ancient history
- Sub-discipline: Archaeology, Epigraphy, Numismatics
- School or tradition: Annales school
- Institutions: University of Warsaw
- Main interests: Barbaricum, Roman Agriculture, Slavery in ancient Rome
- Notable works: Le colonat en Afrique sous le Haut-Empire, Paris: Les Belles Lettres 1976
- Notable ideas: Hermeneutics of Archaeology
- Influenced: Aleksander Bursche, Andrzej Kokowski, Fernando López Pardo

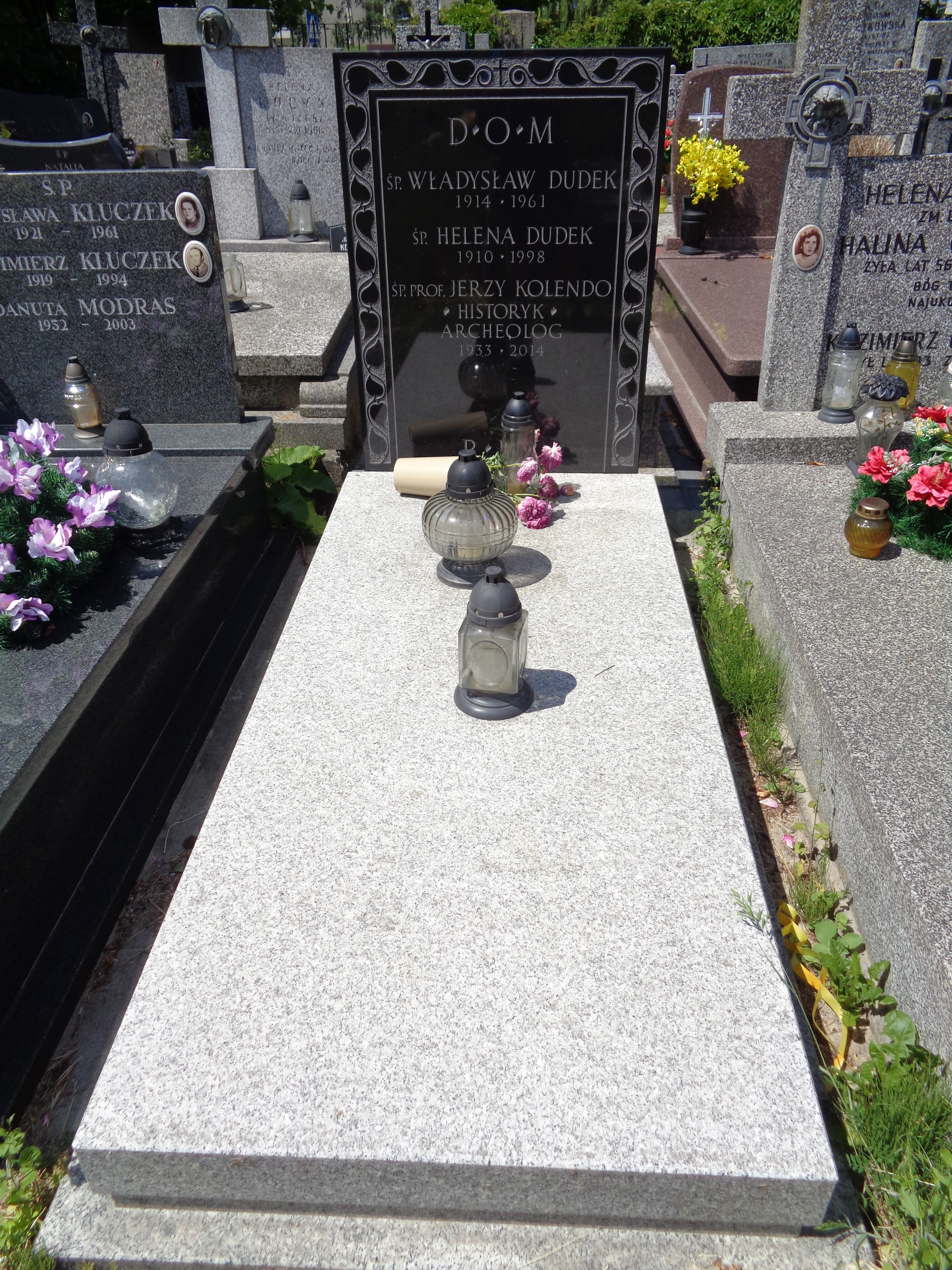
Grave of Prof. Jerzy Kolendo in Warsaw

Jerzy Władysław Kolendo (9 June 1933, Brest-on-the-Bug – 28 February 2014, Warsaw) was an acknowledged Polish authority on the history and archaeology of Ancient Rome. He was an exponent of the French Annales school, an epigraphist and specialist in the relations between the Barbaricum and the early Roman Empire.

== Life ==
He was the son of parents involved in education. His father died when he was young and the family moved from Brest-on-the-Bug to Białystok where he spent his schooldays. While his desire was to become an archaeologist, he feared his lack of drawing ability would discount his chances of gaining a university place, so he opted to study ancient history. Kolendo graduated from the University of Warsaw in 1955, going on to a masters and a doctoral degree at Warsaw in 1960. He completed his habilitation in history in 1968. He gained a professorship in 1979.

The burden of his archaeological research was into the Ancient Mediterranean Basin and into questions of epigraphy. He was focussed on the economic and social interactions between ancient Rome and the Barbaricum, with particular reference to the territory which would later become known as Poland. Between 1955 and 1981 he was associated with and a member of the Polish Academy of Arts and Sciences (PAN). Thereafter he was primarily involved in working with the Institute of Archaeology at Warsaw University.

=== Retirement ===
In 2003 he notionally retired but remained at the Archaeological Institute in the role of Emeritus at the Centre of Research into Southeast European antiquity. He lectured widely abroad, notably in Paris, Lyon and in Padua. He remained a member of various institutes such as, Towarzystwo Naukowe Warszawskie, correspondent of the Polska Akademia Umiejętności and honorary member of the Komitet Nauk o Kulturze Antycznej Polska Akademia Nauk. He continued writing for scientific journals, including, Archeologia, Meander, Dialogues d'histoire ancienne and Palamedes. A Journal of Ancient History. Kolendo was buried at Służew New Cemetery.

== Legacy ==
After World War II, thanks to academic exchanges, Kolendo and his friend, Bronisław Geremek, were greatly influenced by Fernand Braudel and the French l'École des Annales. Kolendo's work has widened understanding of Roman influence in the ancient world, of Roman Gaul, the Roman army, of emperor Nero, the references in Tacitus' writings and of Rome's foreign relations. His work on the Colonat partiaire in North Africa demonstrates the extent to which it was Rome's granary. His work also highlighted the nature of Slavery in ancient Rome. He reasoned that Roman Italy reached a plateau in its agricultural technology, a subject he developed in a monograph published in Italian. This led the eminent French historian Louis Robert to quip that the only people to know about the reasons behind the poor revenues from Roman agricultural estates were Koushchin from Moscow and Kolendo from Warsaw.

Kolendo was esteemed for his teaching: he supervised over forty masters and doctoral theses, among them, the Spaniard Fernando López Pardo, a North African specialist.

== Distinctions ==
- Visiting Professor University of Padua 1983-1986
- Visiting Professor University of Strasbourg II 1988
- Visiting Professor Paris 1 Panthéon-Sorbonne University 1993-1994
- Special Prize from the Polish Polish Council of Ministers 2004

Recognizing his scholarly accomplishments, president Bronisław Komorowski presented Kolendo with the Commander's Cross of the Order of Polonia Restituta in 2011.

=== Memorial ===
A volume in memory of Professor Kolendo was published by the University of Warsaw. It has 30 contributors from the fields of archaeology, history and epigraphy.

== Selected publications ==
He is the author of over 600 articles, books and monographs.

- Kolonat w Afryce rzymskiej w I–II wieku i jego geneza, Warszawa: Państwowe Wydawnictwo Naukowe 1962 (thèse de doctorat).
- Postęp techniczny a problem siły roboczej w rolnictwie starożytnej Italii, Wrocław: Zakład Narodowy im. Ossolińskich Wydawnictwo PAN 1968.
- Le traité d'agronomie des Saserna, trad. par Janina Kasińska, Wrocław: Zakład Narodowy im. Ossolińskich 1973.
- Centres et péripheries de la civilisation antique en Afrique du Nord, phénomène urbain (avec Tadeusz Kotula), San Francisco 1975.
- Le colonat en Afrique sous le Haut-Empire, Paris: Les Belles Lettres 1976.
- Inscriptions grecques et latines de Novae, Mésie inférieure. Bordeaux: Ausonius. 1977.
- Actes du colloque sur l'esclavage, Nieborów 2–6 XII 1975, réd. par Iza Bieżuńska-Małowist et Jerzy Kolendo, Varsovie: Éditions UW 1979.
- Deux amphithéâtres dans une seule ville. Le cas d'Aquincum et de Carnuntum. in: Archeologia. Rocznik Instytutu archeologii i etnologii Polskiej akademii nauk. vol. 30, 1979, pp. 39–55.
- À la recherche de l'ambre baltique l'expédition d'un chevalier romain sous Néron, Varsovie: Éditions Uniwersytet Warszawski 1981.
- Trigarium, lieu d'entraînement des auriges et des chevaux à Rome et à Thevestes. in: Archeologia. Rocznik Instytutu archeologii i etnologii Polskiej Akademii Nauk, vol. 35, 1984, pp. 27–32.
- Roman acquaintance with the south-east Baltic coast. The Karbones of Ptolemy. dans: Reallexikon der Germanischen Altertumskunde Barbaricum 2 (1992) pp. 186–90.
- Les recherches sur l'antiquité: menées par des Polonais en France au XIXe s., trad. Katarzyna Bartkiewicz, Warszawa: Upowszechnianie Nauki – Oświata "UN-O" 1997.
- Świat antyczny i barbarzyńcy: teksty, zabytki, refleksja nad przeszłością, t 1–2, Warszawa: IA UW 1998.
- Kolekcje numizmatyczne rodziny Lelewelów. in: Wiadomości Numizmatyczne. vol. 45, No. 1, 2001, ISSN 0043-5155, p. 45–60, (The numismatic collection of the Lelewel family).
- Teksty i pomniki: zarys epigrafiki łacińskiej okresu Cesarstwa Rzymskiego (with Jerzy Żelazowski), Warszawa: OBA Novae 2003.
- Antyczne korzenie koncepcji autochtonizmu i migracjonizmu, Poznań: Wydawnictwo Contact 2007.
- Antiquarian studies in Poland from the sixteenth to the twentieth century, Warszawa: Instytut Badań Interdyscyplinarnych "Artes Liberales" UW, Kraków: Wydział Filologiczny Polskiej Akademii Umiejętności 2011.

=== Collected works ===
- Jerzy Kolendo; John Scheid; Paul Veyne; Claude Nicolet; Jean-Michel Carrié; Aldo Schiavone; Yvon Thébert; Jean-Paul Morel (1992). Andrea Giardina (ed.). L'Homme romain. L'univers historique (in French). Paris: Éditions du Seuil. p. 477. ISBN 978-2-02-012336-5..
- Dzieje archeologii na Uniwersytecie Warszawskim, praca zbiorowa pod red. nauk. Stefana Karola Kozłowskiego i Jerzego Kolendo, Varsovie: Éditions Uniwersytet Warszawski 1993.
- Arcadiana: Arcadia in Poland: an 18th century antique garden and its famous sculptures, by Anna Jaskulska-Tschierse, Jerzy Kolendo, Tomasz Mikocki, ed. Tomasz Mikocki, Warsaw: Institute of Archeology Warsaw University 1998.
- Nowe znaleziska importów rzymskich z ziem Polski. 1 , pod red. Jerzego Kolendo, przy współpr. Jacka Andrzejowskiego, Aleksandra Bursche i Wojciecha Nowakowskiego, Warszawa: IA UW 1998.
- Nowe znaleziska importów rzymskich z ziem Polski. 2 , pod red. Jerzego Kolendo i Aleksandra Bursche, przy współpr. Borysa Paszkiewicza, Warszawa: IA UW 2001.
- A companion to the study of Novae: history of research, Novae in ancient sources, historical studies, geography, topography, and cartography, bibliography 1726–2008, ed. by Tomasz Derda, Piotr Dyczek, and Jerzy Kolendo with contributions by Renata Ciołek, Warszawa: Center for Research on the Antiquity of Southeastern Europe. University of Warsaw 2008.

== See also ==
- List of Poles
- Andrzej Kokowski
- Marek Olędzki
- Ryszard Wołągiewicz
- Kazimierz Godłowski
