= Bhumaka =

Early 2nd century Indo-Scythian Western Kshatrapa ruler

- Western Satrap
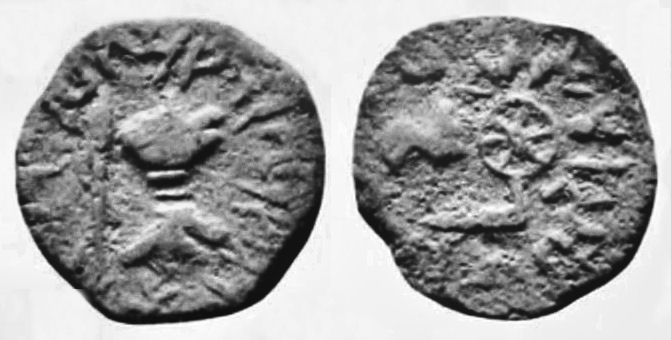
- Coin of Bhumaka. Obv:Arrow, pellet, and thunderbolt. Kharoshthi inscription Chaharasada Chatrapasa Bhumakasa: "Ksaharata Satrap Bhumaka". Rev: Capital of a pillar with seated lion with upraised paw, and wheel (dharmachakra). Brahmi inscription: Kshaharatasa Kshatrapasa Bhumakasa.
- Reign: 1st century CE
- Predecessor: Abhiraka
- Successor: Nahapana

Bhumaka (Kharosthi: 𐨧𐨂𐨨𐨐 Bhu-ma-ka, Bhu-ma-ka; Brahmi: 𑀪𑀽𑀫𑀓 Bhū-ma-ka, Bhū-ma-ka; r. 1st century CE) was a Western Kshatrapa ruler of the early 1st century CE. He was the father of the great ruler Nahapana, according to one of the latter's coins. He was preceded by Abhiraka (Aubhirakes), of whom a few coins are known. Some scholars identified Bhumaka with Ysamotika, the father of Chashtana, on the grounds that Ysamo is a Scythian term meaning "territory" or Sanskrit bhumi. However, Rapson and other scholars rejected this identification, arguing that similarity in the meaning of names does not necessarily establish identity of persons.

His coins bear Buddhist symbols, such as the eight-spoked wheel (dharmachakra), or the lion seated on a capital, a representation of a pillar of Ashoka.

Bhumaka's coins have been found in the regions of Gujarat, Kathiawad and Malwa.

== Notes ==
| Preceded by Abhiraka | Western Satrap ?–119 | Succeeded by Nahapana |
