= Andrzej Kokowski =

Polish archaeologist (born 1953)

- Born: 1953 (age 72–73); Złotów, Poland
- Awards: Gold Cross of Merit (2007); Knight's Cross of the Order of Polonia Restituta (2014)

Academic work
- Discipline: Archaeology
- Institutions: Maria Curie-Skłodowska University

Andrzej Kokowski (born 1953) is a Polish archaeologist who is a Professor of Archaeology and Director of the Institute of Archaeology at Maria Curie-Skłodowska University.

== Biography ==
Andrzej Kokowski was born in Złotów in 1953. He received his PhD from the Adam Mickiewicz University in Poznań in 1996 with a thesis on the Wielbark culture. Since 2000, Kokowski has been Professor of Archaeology at Maria Curie-Skłodowska University. He is the Founder and Director of the Institute of Archaeology at Maria Curie-Skłodowska University.

Kokowski specializes in the archaeology of Poland in the Pre-Roman Iron Age and the Roman Iron Age, particularly cultures associated with the Goths, Vandals and Sarmatians, on which he has managed numerous projects. Kokowski is an internationally renowned authority on Gothic migrations. He is a fellow of the Alexander von Humboldt Foundation and the author of hundreds of scientific publications. Kokowski was awarded the Gold Cross of Merit in 2007, and the Knight's Cross of the Order of Polonia Restituta in 2014.

Between 1980 and 1989 he was registered as a secret collaborator of the Polish Communist Security Service (Służba Bezpieczeństwa), operating under the codename "Wisłok". He was dealt with by Department II of the Voivodship Headquarters of the Citizens' Militia (Komenda Wojewódzka Milicji Obywatelskiej) / Voivodship Internal Affairs Office (Wojewódzki Urząd Spraw Wewnętrznych) in Lublin.

== Selected works ==
- Lubelszczyzna w młodszym okresie przedrzymskim i w okresie rzymskim (Lublin 1991)
- Gródek nad Bugiem: cmentarzysko grupy masłomęckiej (Lublin 1993)
- Grupa masłomęcka. Z badań nad przemianami kultury Gotów w młodszym okresie rzymskim (Lublin 1995)
- Archeologia Gotów. Goci w Kotlinie Hrubieszowskiej (Lublin 1999)
- Starożytna Polska. Od trzeciego wieku przed narodzeniem Chrystusa do schyłku starożytności (2005)
- Goci. Od Skandzy do Campi Gothorum (od Skandynawii do Półwyspu Iberyjskiego) (2007)
- 30 powodów do dumy z mieszkania w krainie Gotów (Lublin 2007)
- Przygoda z archeologią, czyli najstarsze dzieje Krajny Złotowskiej (do czasów lokacji miasta Złotowa) (Warszawa 2011)

== See also ==
- Jerzy Kolendo
- Marek Olędzki
- Ryszard Wołągiewicz
- Kazimierz Godłowski
