= Kazimierz Godłowski =

Kazimierz Godłowski (December 9, 1934 in Kraków – July 9, 1995 in Kraków) was a Polish archeologist and historian specializing in the prehistoric period.

He was the son of Włodzimierz Godłowski, a professor at the Wilno University, who was murdered by the Soviet NKVD in 1940 Katyń massacre.

Kazimierz Godłowski was an archeology student at the Jagiellonian University 1951-1955 and from 1955 an academic teacher and researcher at the Institute of Archeology there. 1976-1991 Director of the Institute, full professor from 1983. From 1991 member of the Polish Academy of Learning. Member of many Polish and foreign scientific societies, including the German Archaeological Institute from 1975 and the Bavarian Academy of Sciences from 1994. From 1992 he was co-editor of the Monumenta Archaeologica Barbarica series.

Godłowski conducted research concerned with the chronology of the Roman period, the Migration Period in East-Central Europe, the Przeworsk culture, the ethnic situation in Europe during La Tène and Roman periods and the origin of the Slavs. As his research convinced him of the impossibility of settlement continuity in Poland between the ancient and medieval eras, he became steadfastly opposed to the predominant at that time notions and theories of primordial Slavic settlements in Poland, tracing the Slavic origins to even further east in Europe instead. An author of numerous scientific publications in Polish, German and English (The Chronology of Late Roman and Early Migration Periods in Central Europe (1970)).

== See also ==
- Andrzej Kokowski
- Marek Olędzki
- Ryszard Wołągiewicz
- Jerzy Kolendo
