= Abiria =

Region of ancient India

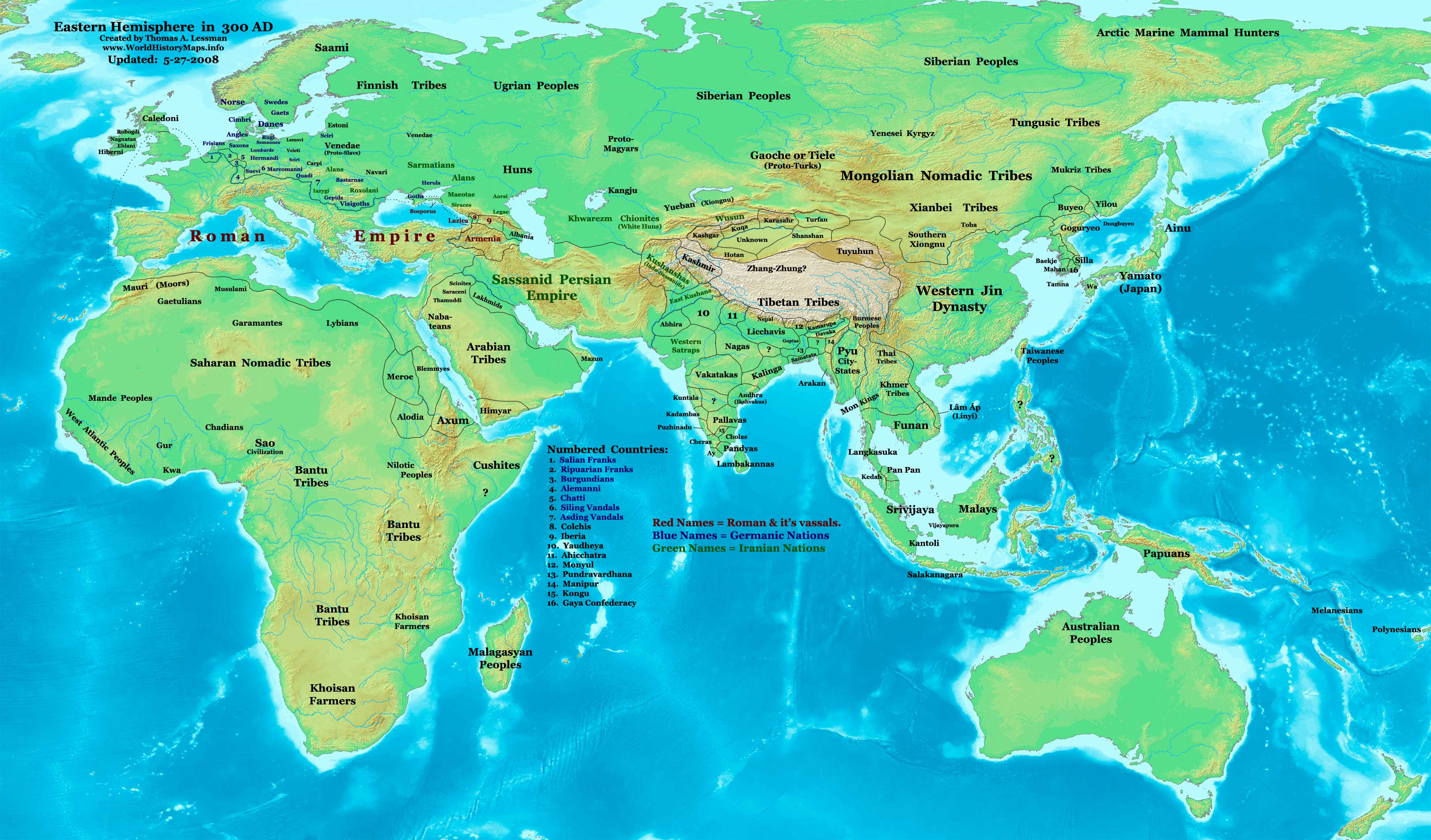
Location of the Abiria country.

Abiria (Note: Also known as Abhiradesha, or Abhiradesá. Abiria may be rendered "Aberia" or "Abhiria".) was a country mentioned in the Periplus of the Erythraean Sea and by Ptolemy in his Geographia. The Periplus mentions it as Aberia with the coastal district Syrastrene (modern-day Saurashtra, Gujarat), and Ptolemy locates it above the Indus delta.

== Location ==
The Periplus of the Erythraean Sea and Geographia by Ptolemy locate Abiria between the lower Sindh valley and Kathiawar, apparently in southwest Rajputana and adjoining regions. In the Puranas however, the domains of the Abhira kings were located in the northwestern region of the Deccan.

=== Mention by Ptolemy ===
Abiria was mentioned by Ptolemy when he described the territory of the Kshatrapa, Chastana:

Moreover the region which is next to the western part of India, is called Indoscythia. A part of this region around the (Indus) river mouth is Patalena, above which is Abiria. That which is about the mouth of the Indus and the Canthicolpus bay is called Syrastrena. ... In the island formed by this river are the cities Pantala, Barbaria. ... The Larica region of Indoscythia is located eastward from the swamp near the sea, in which on the west of the Namadus river is the interior city of Barygaza emporium. On the east side of the river ... Ozena-Regia Tiastani ... Minagara".

— Ptolemy Geographia, Book Seven, Chapter I

=== Mention in the Periplus of the Erythraean Sea ===
Abiria is also mentioned in the 1st century CE Periplus of the Erythraean Sea:

Beyond the gulf of Baraca is that of Barygaza and the coast of the country of Ariaca, which is the beginning of the Kingdom of Nambanus and of all India. That part of it lying inland and adjoining Scythia is called Abiria, but the coast is called Syrastrene. It is a fertile country, yielding wheat and rice and sesame oil and clarified butter, cotton and the Indian cloths made therefrom, of the coarser sorts. Very many cattle are pastured there, and the men are of great stature and black in color. The metropolis of this country is Minnagara, from which much cotton cloth is brought down to Barygaza.

— Periplus, Chap. 41.

== See also ==
- Saraostus
- Abhira dynasty
- Periplus of the Erythraean Sea
