= Nahapana =

2nd-century Western Satrap ruler

- Western Satrap
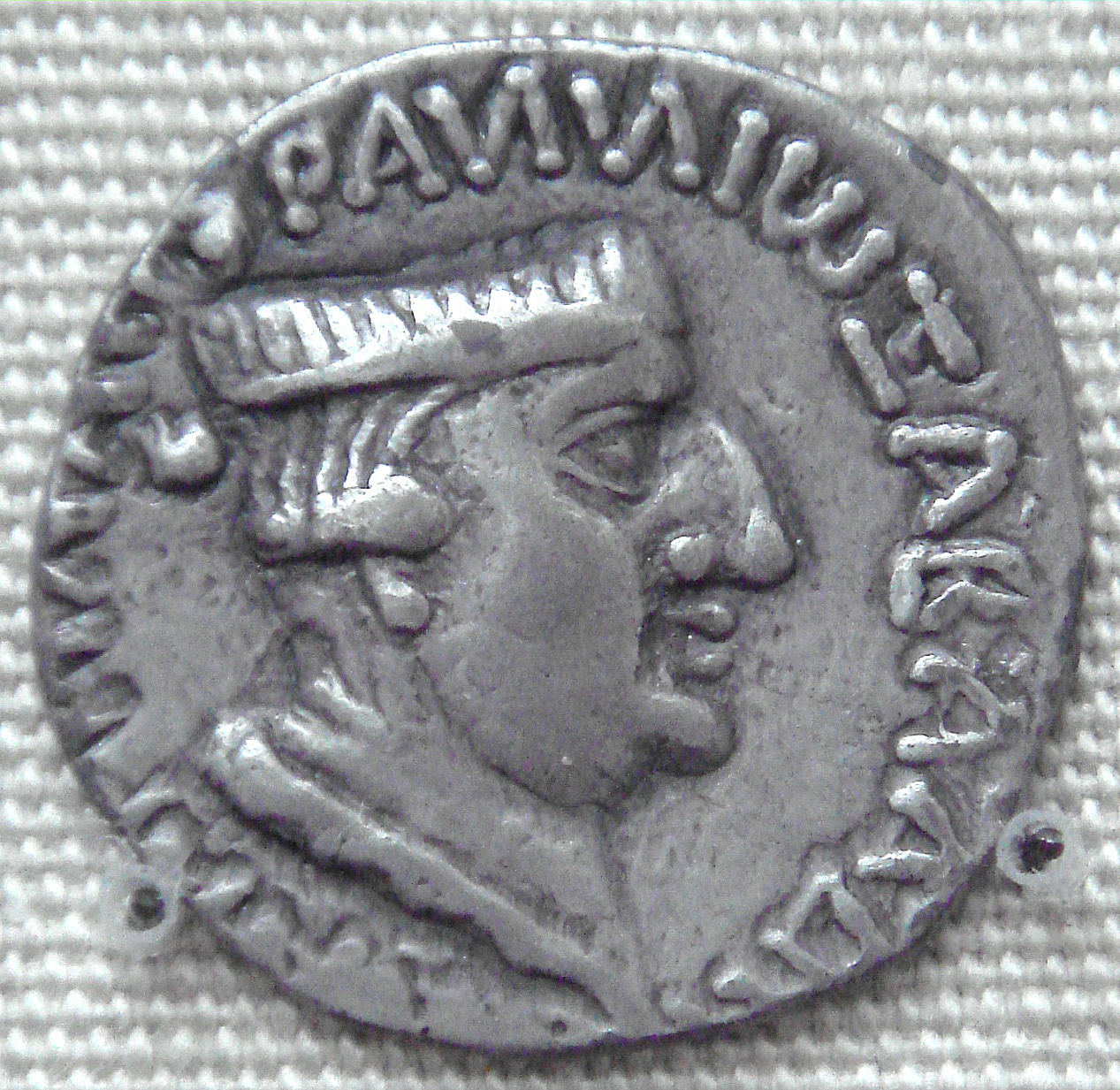
- Silver coin of Nahapana, with ruler profile and pseudo-Greek legend "ΡΑΝΝΙΩ ΞΑΗΑΡΑΤΑϹ ΝΑΗΑΠΑΝΑϹ", transliteration of the Prakrit "Raño Kshaharatasa Nahapanasa" (or "King Kshaharata Nahapana"). British Museum.
- Reign: 1st century – 78
- Predecessor: Bhumaka
- Successor: Chastana
- Father: Bhumaka

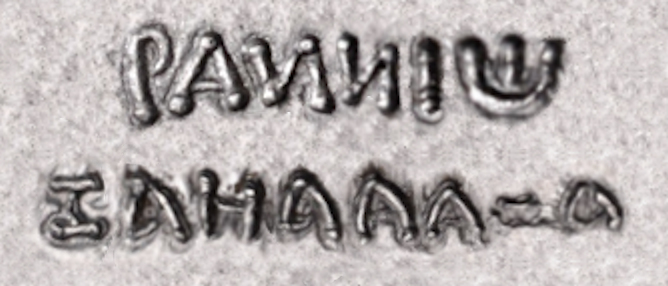
The Greco-Prakrit title "RANNIO KSAHARATA" ("ΡΑΝΝΙω ΞΑΗΑΡΑΤΑ(Ϲ)", Prakrit for "King Kshaharata" rendered in corrupted Greek letters) on the obverse of the coinage of Nahapana.

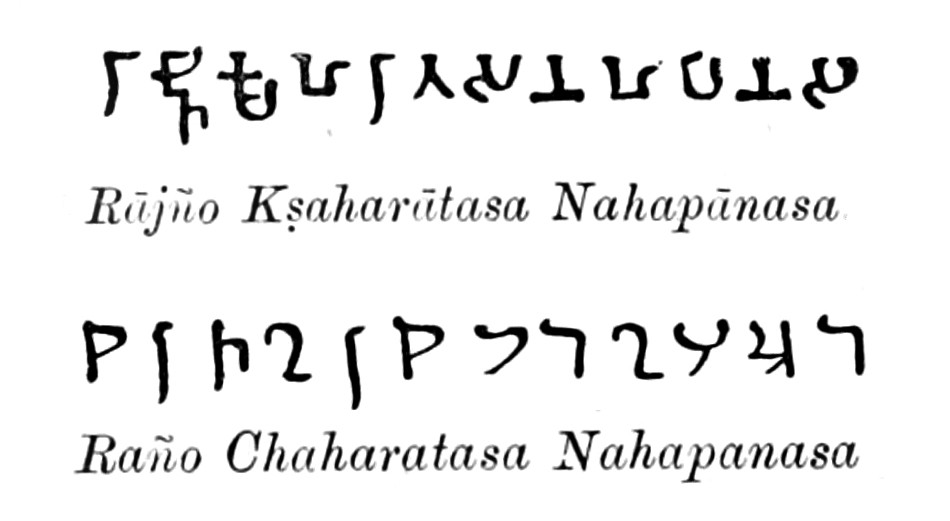
Nahapana Brahmi and Kharoshthi legends on his coinage "RAJNO KSHAHARATASA NAHAPANASA "Of the Rajah Nahapana, the Kshaharata".

Nahapana (Ancient Greek: Ναηαπάνα Nahapána; Kharosthi: 𐨣𐨱𐨤𐨣 Na-ha-pa-na, Nahapana; Brahmi: Na-ha-pā-na, Nahapāna;), was a member of Kshaharata dynasty in northwestern India, who ruled during the 1st or 2nd century CE. According to one of his coins, he was the son of Bhumaka.

== Name ==
Nahapana's name appears on his coins in the Kharosthi form Nahapana (𐨣𐨱𐨤𐨣), the Brahmi form Nahapāna, and the Greek form Nahapána (Ναηαπάνα), which are derived from the Saka name *Nāhapānä, which means "protector of the clan".

== Period ==
The exact period of Nahapana is uncertain. A group of his inscriptions are dated to the years 41-46 of an unspecified era. Assuming that this era is the Shaka era (which starts in 78 CE), some scholars have assigned his reign to 119-124 CE. Some scholars argue that his reign lasted from 41 to 46 and assign his rule to a different period. For example, Krishna Chandra Sagar assigns his reign to 24-70 CE, while R.C.C. Fynes dates it to c. 66-71 CE, and Shailendra Bhandare regards 78 CE as the last year of his reign.

== Reign ==
The Periplus of the Erythraean Sea mentions one Nambanus as the ruler of the area around Barigaza. This person has been identified as Nahapana by modern scholars. The text describes Nambanus as follows:

Beyond the gulf of Baraca is that of Barygaza and the coast of the country of Ariaca, which is the beginning of the Kingdom of Nambanus and of all India. That part of it lying inland and adjoining Scythia is called Abiria, but the coast is called Syrastrene. It is a fertile country, yielding wheat and rice and sesame oil and clarified butter, cotton and the Indian cloths made therefrom, of the coarser sorts. Very many cattle are pastured there, and the men are of great stature and black in color. The metropolis of this country is Minnagara, from which much cotton cloth is brought down to Barygaza.

— Periplus 41

He also established the Kshatrapa coinage, in a style derived from Indo-Greek coinage. The obverse of the coins consists of the profile of the ruler, within a legend in Greek. The reverse represents a thunderbolt and an arrow, within Brahmi and Kharoshthi legends.

Nahapana is mentioned as a donator in inscriptions of numerous Buddhist caves in northern India. The Nasik and Karle inscriptions refer to Nahapana's dynastic name (Kshaharata, for "Kshatrapa") but not to his ethnicity (Saka-Pahlava), which is known from other sources.

Nahapana had a son-in-law named Ushavadata (Sanskrit: Rishabhadatta), whose inscriptions were incised in the Pandavleni Caves near Nasik. Ushavadata was son of Dinika and had married Dakshamitra, daughter of Nahapana. According to the inscriptions, Ushavadata accomplished various charities and conquests on behalf of his father-in-law. He constructed rest-houses, gardens and tanks at Bharukachchha (Bharuch), Dashapura (Mandasor in Malva), Govardhana (near Nasik) and Shorparaga (Sopara in the Thana district). He also campaigned in the north under the orders of Nahapana to rescue the Uttamabhadras who had been attacked by the Malayas (Malavas). He excavated a cave (one of the Pandavleni Caves) in the Trirashmi hill near Nasik and offered it to the Buddhist monks.

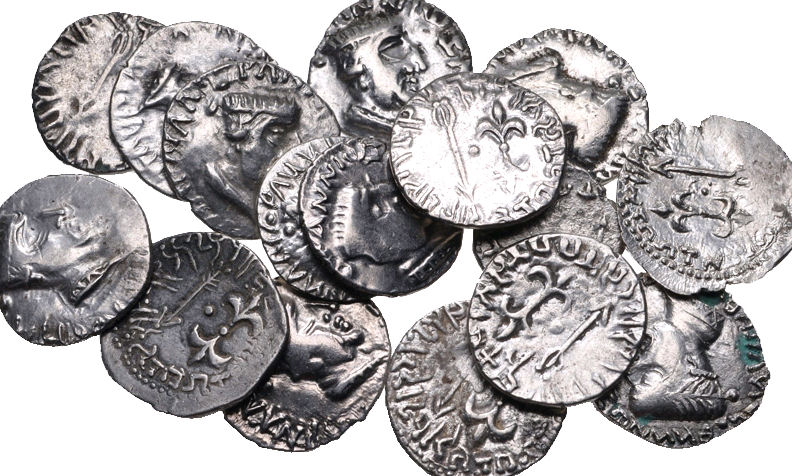
Nahapana coin hoard.

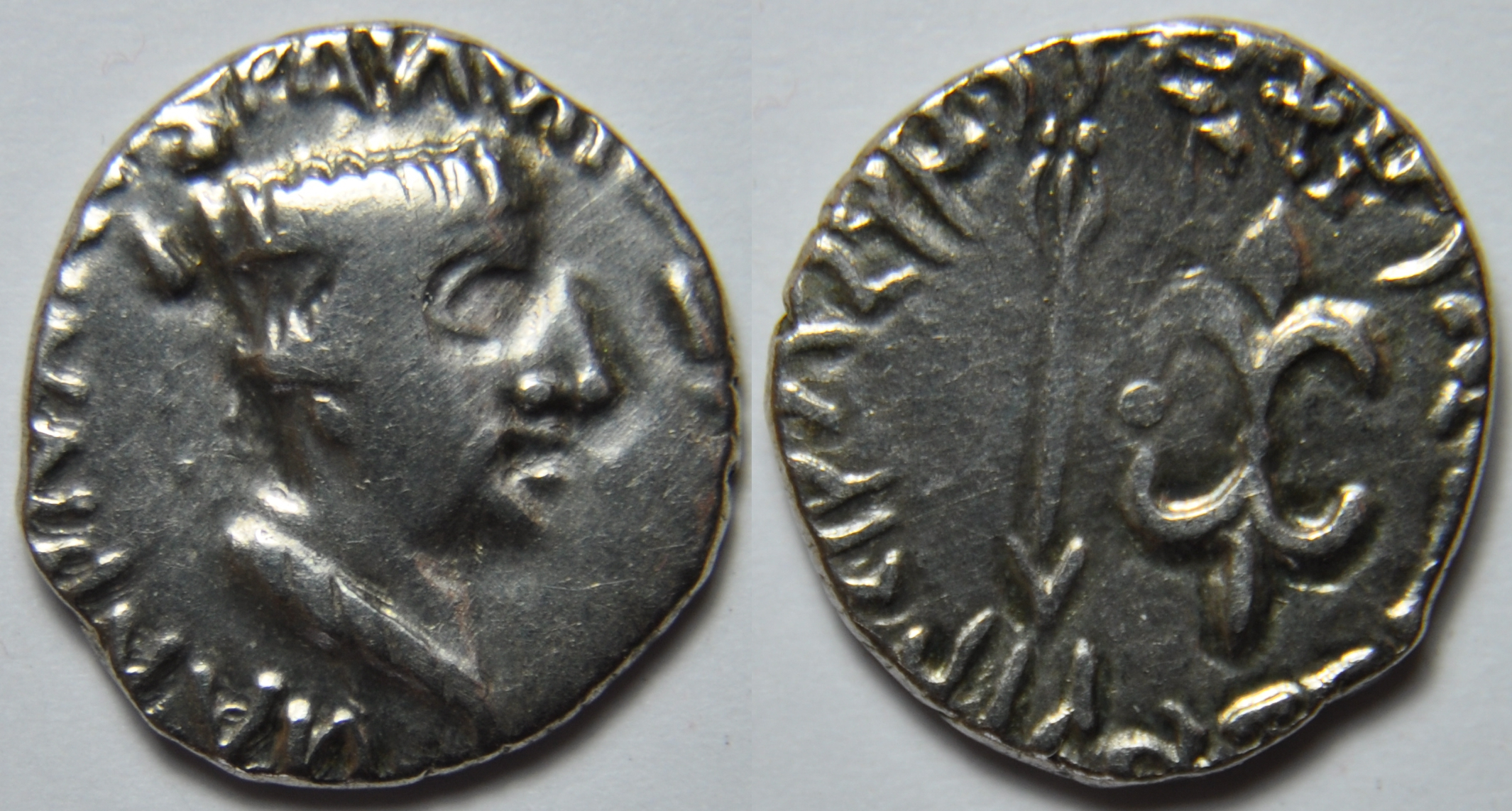
A silver drachma of Nahapana. Obv: Bust of the king crowned with a diadem on the right. Legend in Greek: ΡΑΝΝΙ (ω ΙΑΗΑΡΑΤΑϹ) ΝΑΗΑΠΑ (ΝΑϹ)

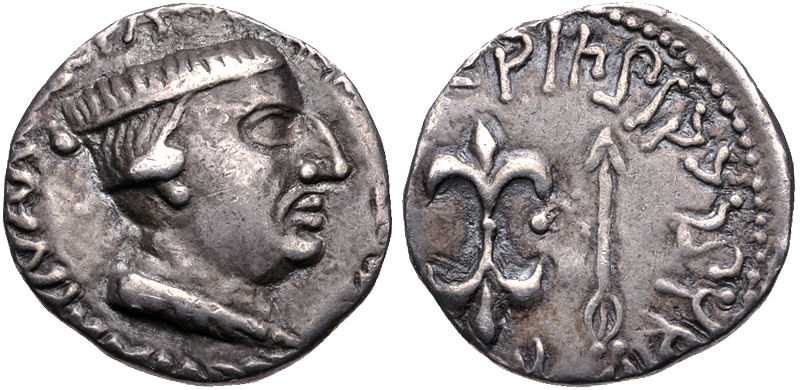
A silver drachma of Nahapana. Rev: An arrow to the left and a lightning to the right. Legend in kharoshthi on the left: Rano Chaharatasa Nahapanasa. Brahmi legend on the right: Rajna Kshaha (ratasa Nahapanasa).

=== Defeat by Gautamiputra Satakarni ===
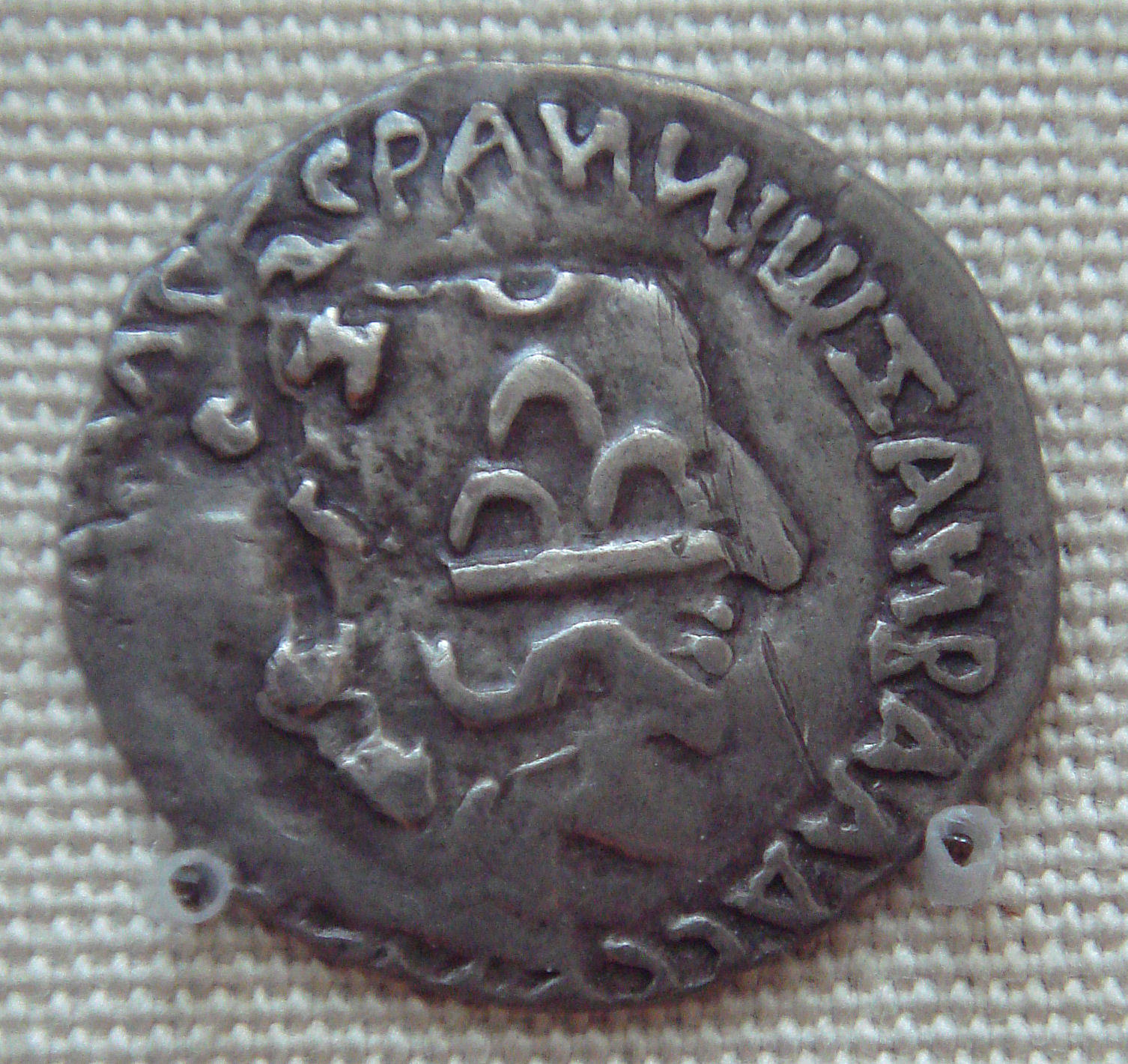
A coin of Nahapana restruck by the Satavahana king Gautamiputra Satakarni. Nahapana's profile and coin legend are still clearly visible.

Overstrikes of Nahapana's coins by the powerful Satavahana king Gautamiputra Satakarni have been found in a hoard at Jogalthambi, Nashik District. This suggests that Gautamiputra defeated Nahapana.The Nasik Cave No.3, inscription No.2 inscription notes that Nahapana's 'Khakharata race' was rooted out, which means all his possible heirs might have been killed.

Earlier scholars such as James Burgess have pointed out that Gautamiputra Satakarni and Nahapana were not necessarily contemporaries, since Satakarni mentions that the areas conquered by him were ruled by Ushavadata, rather than Nahapana. According to Burgess, there might have been an interval of as much as a century between the reigns of these two kings. However, most historians now agree that Gautamiputra and Nahapana were contemporaries, and that Gautamiputra defeated Nahapana. M. K. Dhavalikar dates this event to c. 124 CE, which according to him, was the 18th regnal year of Gautamiputra. R.C.C. Fynes dates the event to sometime after 71 CE, in the same line, Shailendra Bhandare places the victory of Gautamiputra and the end of Nahapana's reign to the start of Saka era, 78 CE, in the year of Chashtana's ascension to the throne, and considers Gautamiputra's whole reign to ca. 60-85 CE.

Nahapana was founder of one of the two major Saka Satrap dynasties in north-western India, the Kshaharatas ("Satraps"); the other dynasty included the one founded by Chashtana.

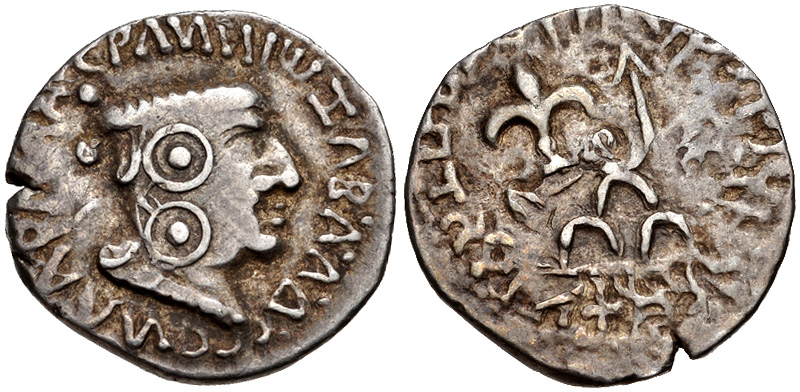
Coin of Gautamiputra Yajna Satakarni struck over a drachm of Nahapana. Circa 167-196 CE. Ujjain symbol and three arched mountain symbol struck respectively on the obverse and reverse of a drachm of Nahapana.

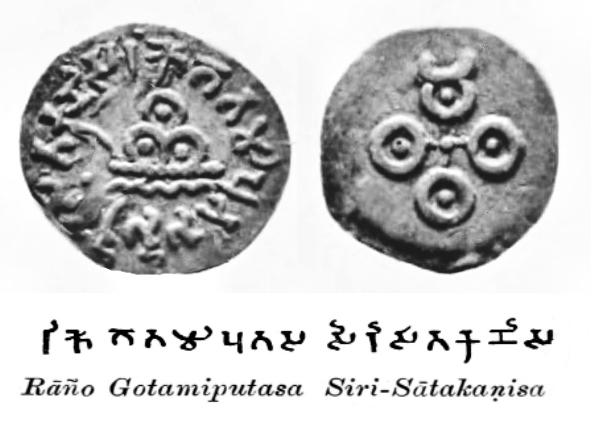
Regular design of the coinage of Gautamiputra Yajna Satakarni, which was struck over the coinage of Nahapana

Initiation as a Jain monk

The Avasyaka Niryukti, the Curnisūtra and the Śrutavatāra of Bibudha Sridhara provide an account of the final days of the Saka chief, Nahapna. According to the last text, Nahapana abdicated the throne and was initiated to Jain asceticism by Jainācārya Arhadbali and he was named Bhutabali. The monk Bhutabali along with the monk Pushpadant would go on to write the Ṣaṭkhaṇḍāgama which is the foremost and oldest Digambara Jain sacred text.

=== Construction and dedication of Buddhist caves ===
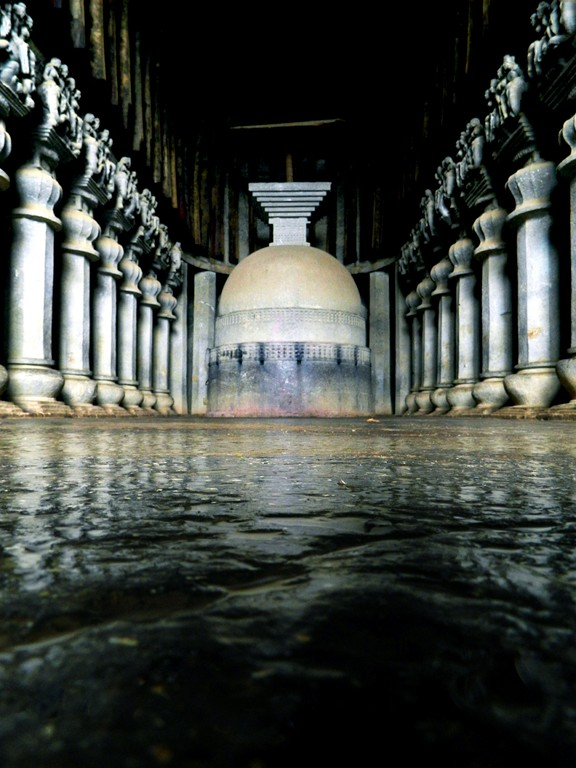
The Chaitya cave complex at Karla Caves was built and dedicated by Nahapana in 120 CE.

The Western Satraps are known for the construction and dedication of numerous Buddhist caves in Central India, particularly in the areas of Maharashtra and Gujarat.

==== Karla caves ====
In particular, the chaitya cave complex of the Karla Caves, the largest in South Asia, was constructed and dedicated in 120 CE by Nahapana, according to several inscriptions in the cave.

An important inscription relates to Nahapana in the Great Chaitya at Karla Caves (Valukura is thought to be an ancient name for Karla Caves):

Success!! By Usabhadata, the son of Dinaka and the son-in-law of the king, the Khaharata, the Kshatrapa Nahapana, who gave three hundred thousand cows, who made gifts of gold and a tirtha on the river Banasa, who gave to the Devas and Bramhanas sixteen villages, who at the pure tirtha Prabhasa gave eight wives to the Brahmanas, and who also fed annually a hundred thousand Brahmanas- there has been given the village of Karajika for the support of the ascetics living in the caves at Valuraka without any distinction of sect or origin, for all who would keep the varsha.

— Inscription of Nahapana, Karla Caves.

Nahapana inscription
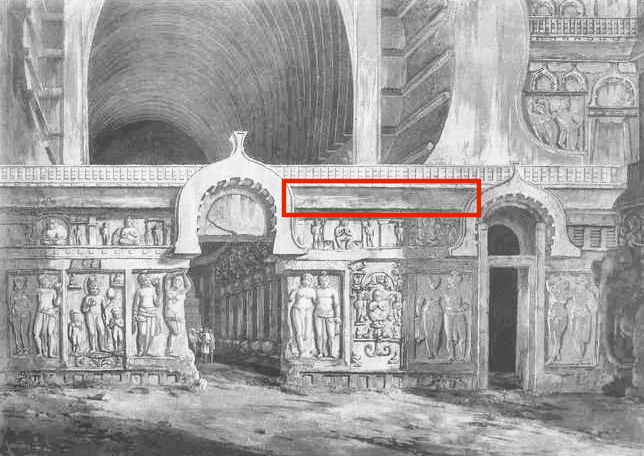
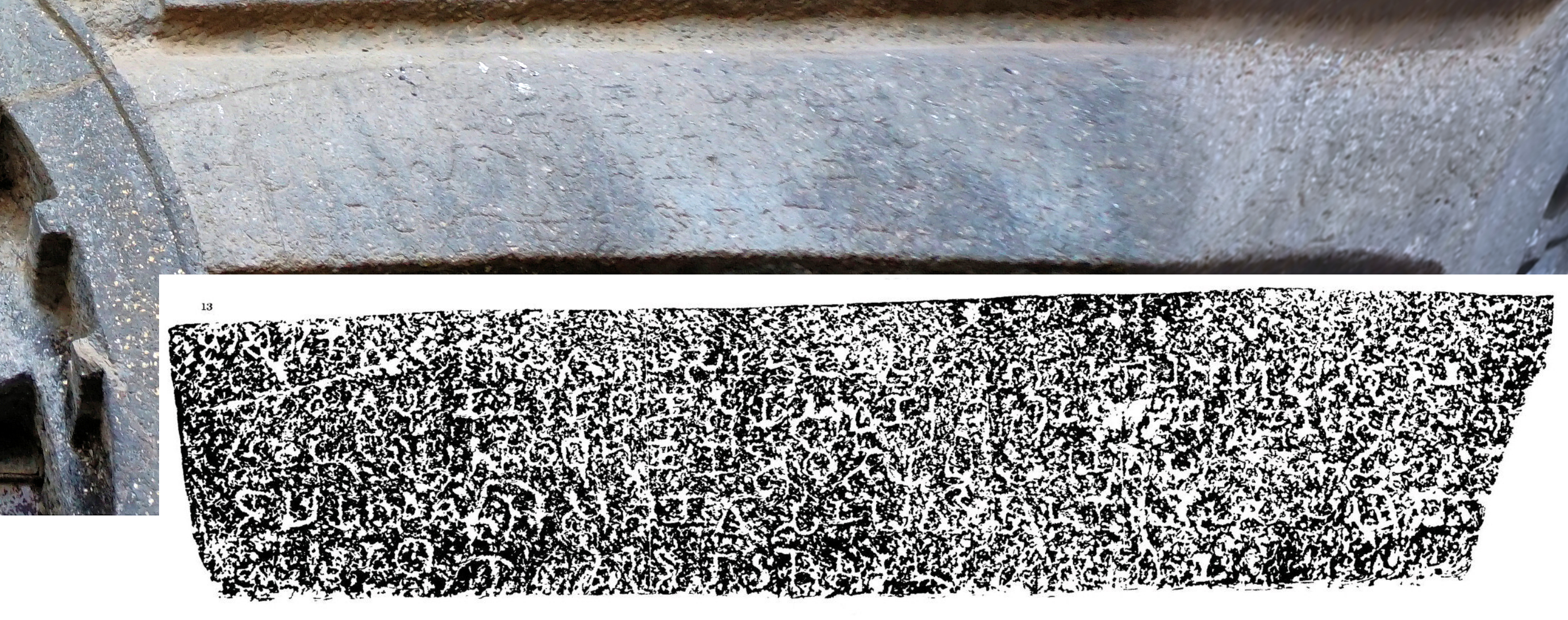
Great Chaitya inscription 13 of Nahapana, at the right of the main entrance.

==== Nahapana vihara at Nasik ====
Parts of the Nasik Caves also were carved during the time of Nahapana, and the Junnar caves also have inscriptions of Nahapana, as well as the Manmodi Caves.

Cave No.10 "Nahapana Vihara" at the Nasik Caves

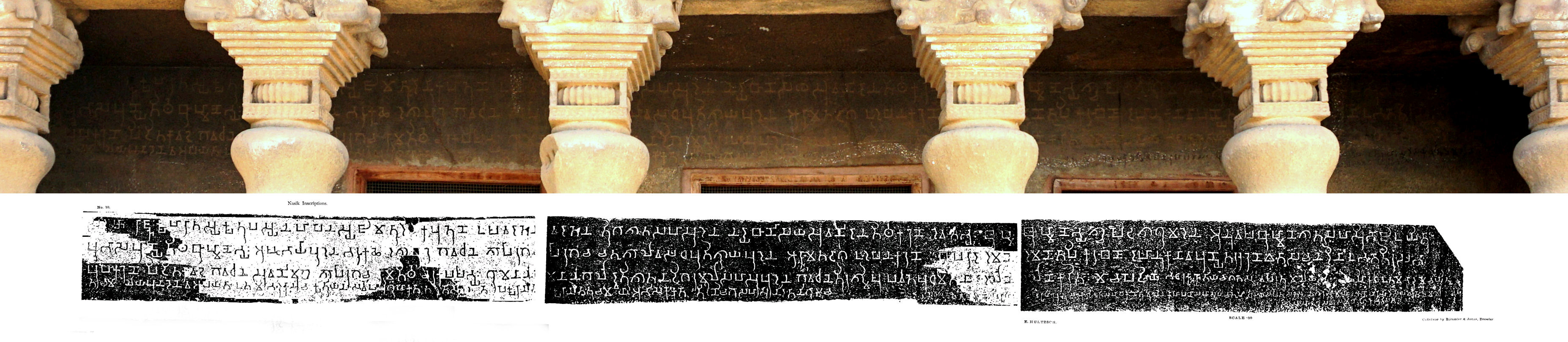

"Success ! Ushavadata, son of Dinika, son-in- law of king Nahapana, the Kshaharata Kshatrapa, (...) inspired by (true) religion, in the Trirasmi hills at Govardhana, has caused this cave to be made and these cisterns...."

— Part of inscription No.10 of Nahapana, Cave No.10, Nasik

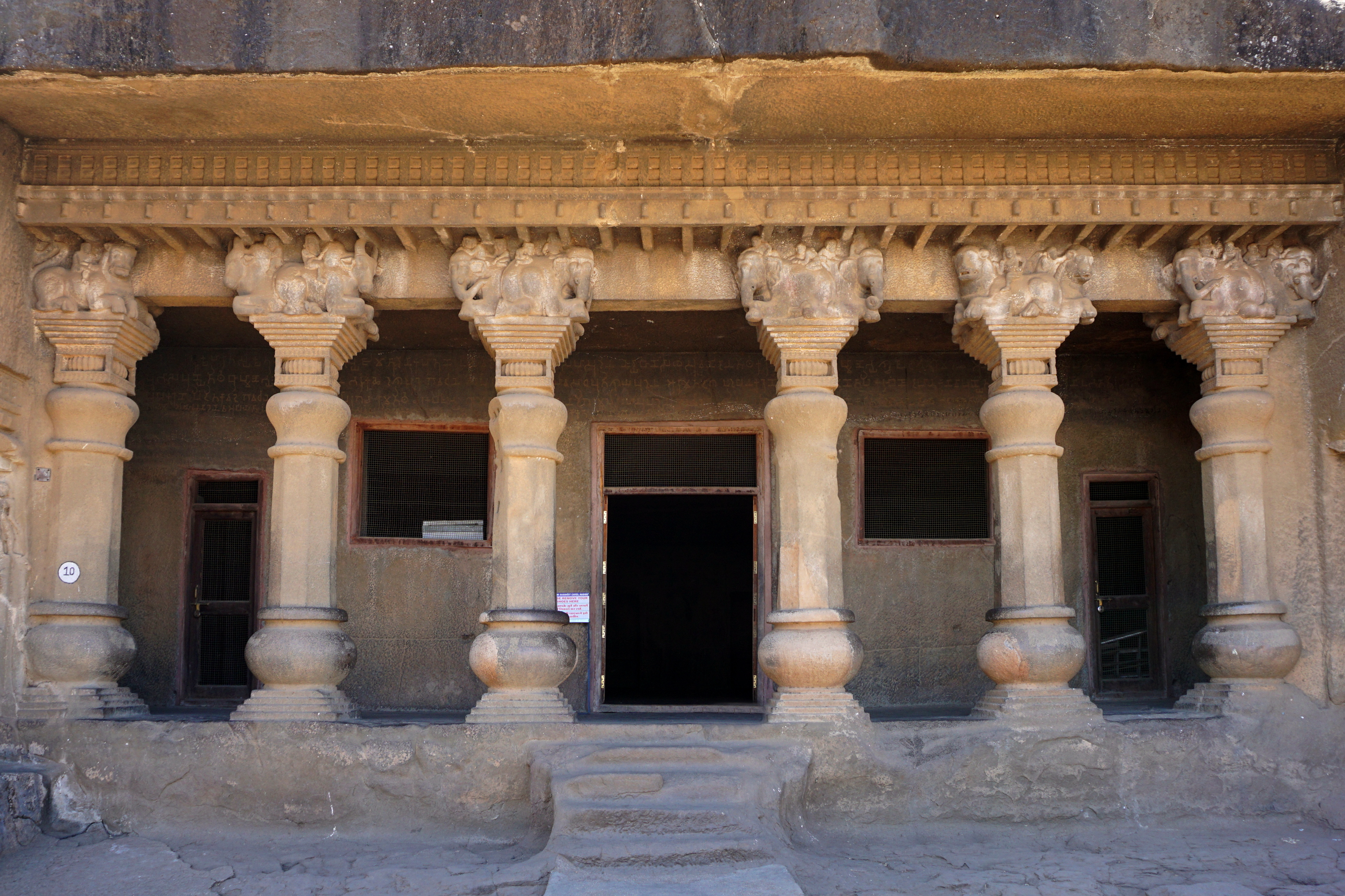
Front

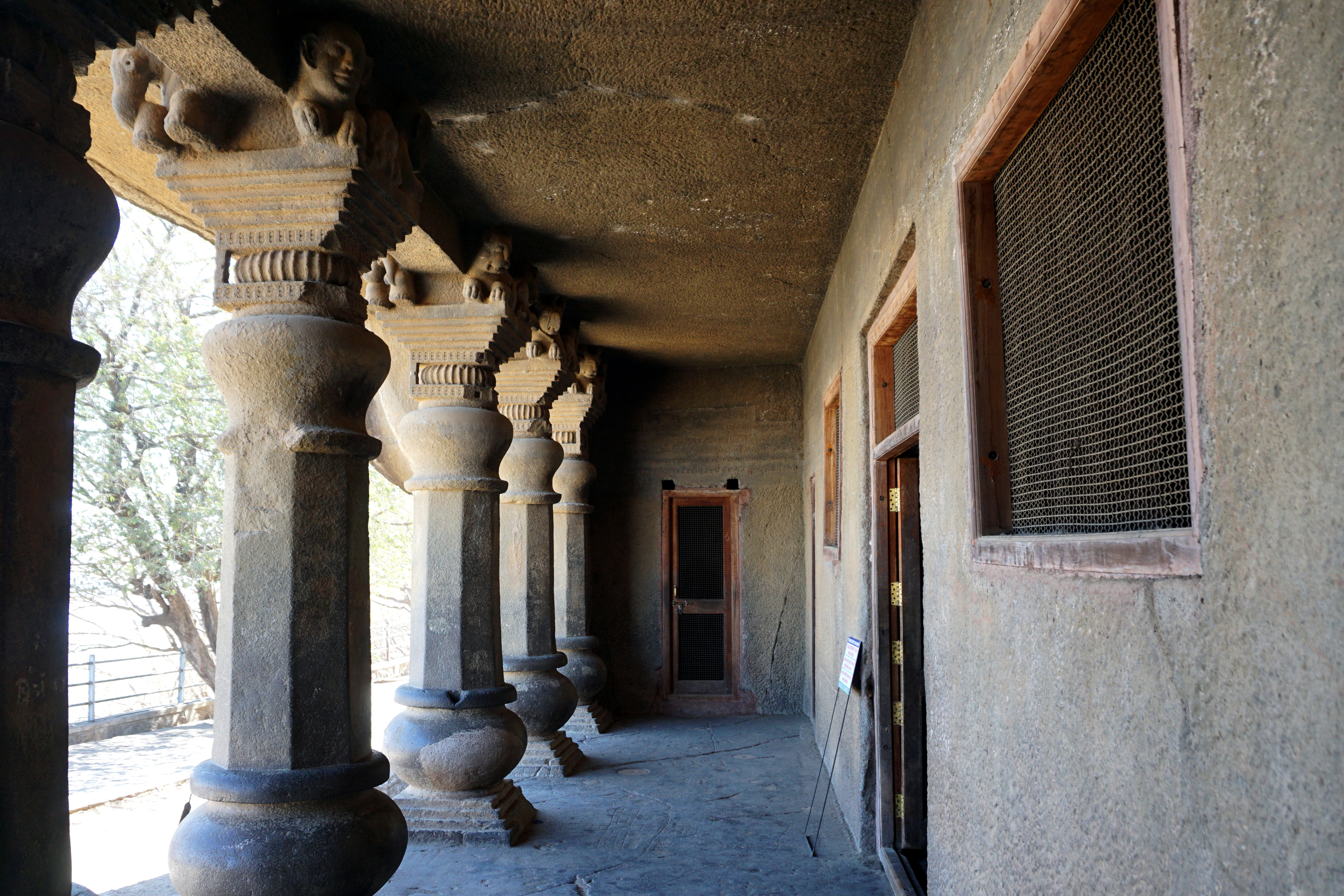
Veranda

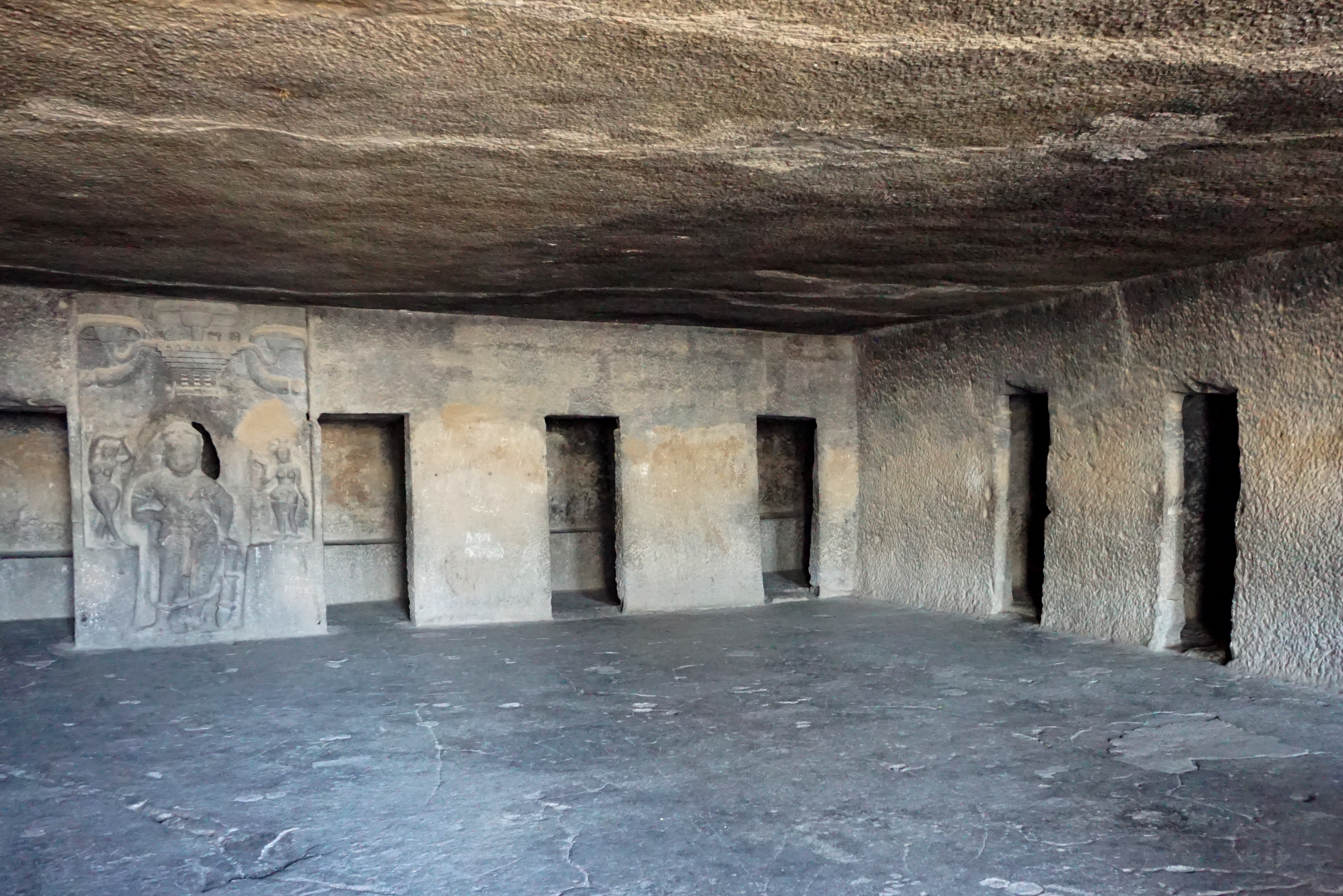
Interior

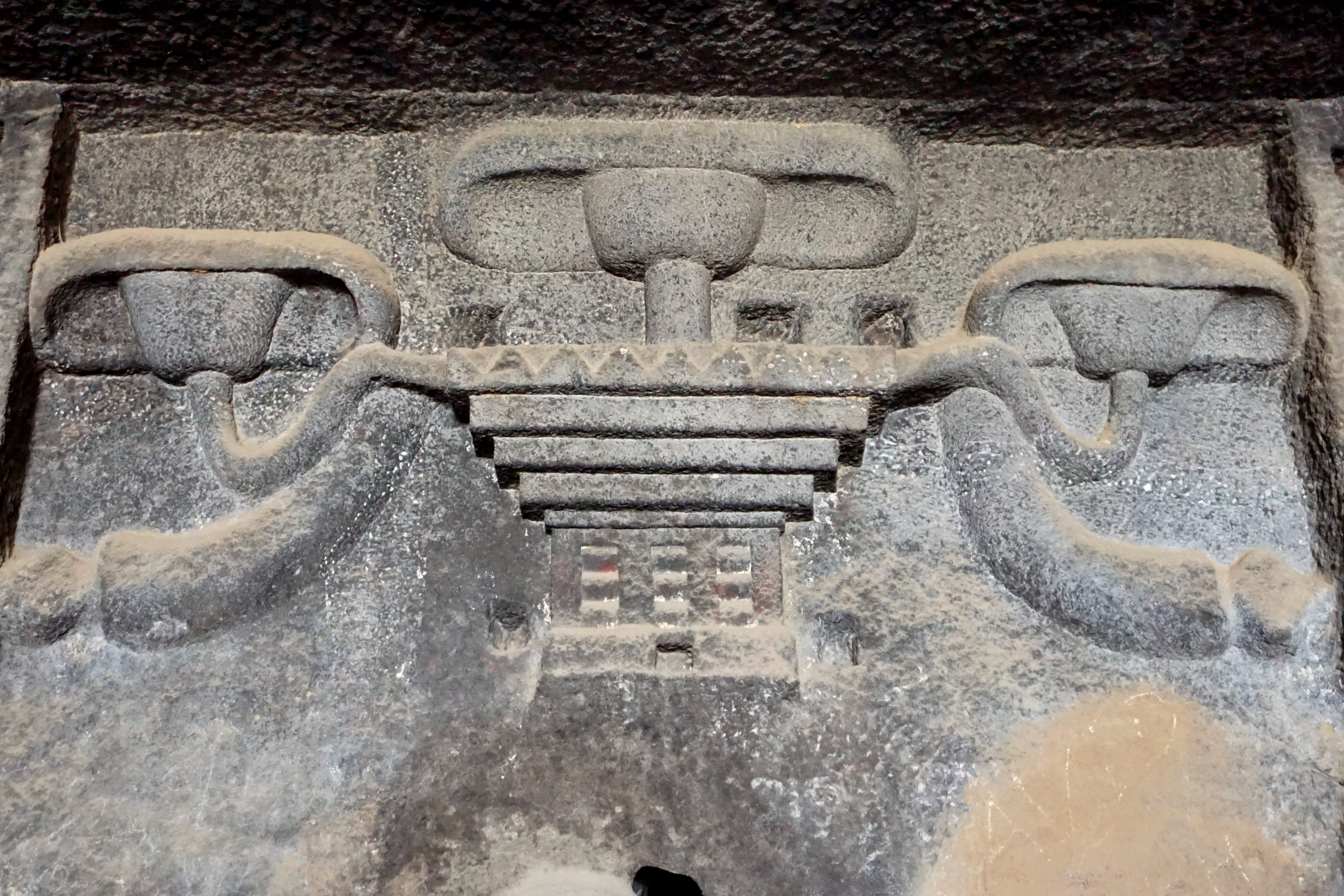
Chaitya and Umbrellas

==== Nahapana cave in Junnar ====
In a Buddhist cave of the Bhimasankar group of the Manmodi Caves in Junnar, there is an inscription in three lines, of which, however, the first letters are obliterated; still it is possible make out that it was [constructed by] "Ayama, the minister of Mahakshatrapa Svami Nahapana." This inscription bears a Saka era date of year 46, which is 124 CE. The inscription is located in the fourth excavation on the eastern side of Manmodi Hill, in Cave 7. It reads:

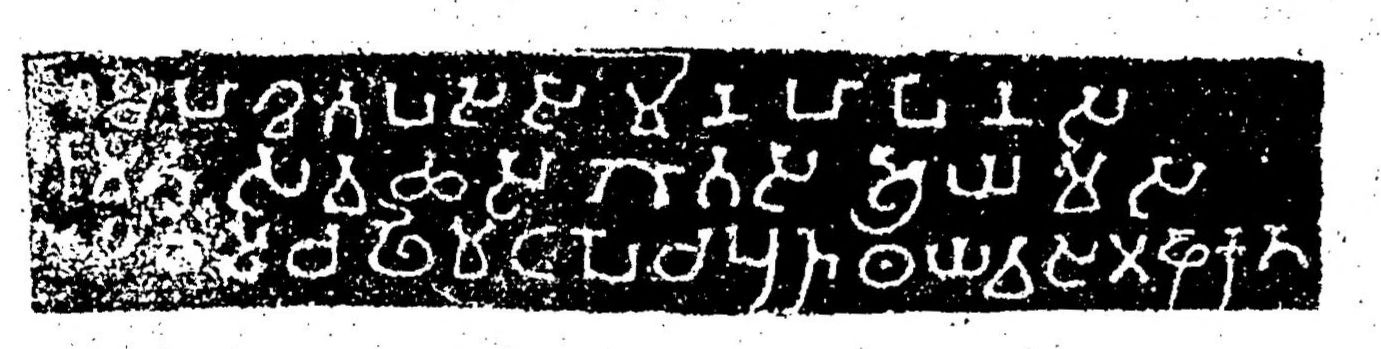

[Raño]jmahākhatapasa sāminahapānasa

[Ā]mātyasa Vachhasagotasa Ayamasa
[de]yadhama cha [po?] ḍhi maṭapo cha puñathaya vase 46 kato

"The meritorious gift of a mandapa and cistern by Ayama of the Vatsa-gotra,
Prime Minister to the king, the great Satrap, the Lord Nahapana, made for merit, in the year 46."

— Inscription of Nahapana, Manmodi Caves.

Territories/ dates	Western India	Western Pakistan Balochistan	Paropamisadae Arachosia	Bajaur	Gandhara	Western Punjab	Eastern Punjab	Mathura
			INDO-GREEK KINGDOM					
90–85 BCE			Nicias	Menander II		Artemidoros		
90–70 BCE			Hermaeus	Archebius				
85-60 BCE			INDO-SCYTHIAN KINGDOM; Maues					
75–70 BCE			Vonones; Spalahores	Telephos		Apollodotus II		
65–55 BCE			Spalirises; Spalagadames			Hippostratos	Dionysios	
55–35 BCE			Azes I				Zoilos II	
55–35 BCE			Azilises; Azes II				Apollophanes	Indo-Scythian dynasty of the NORTHERN SATRAPS; Hagamasha
25 BCE – 10 CE				Indo-Scythian dynasty of the APRACHARAJAS; Vijayamitra (ruled 12 BCE - 15 CE) (Note: From the dated inscription on the Rukhana reliquary)	Liaka Kusulaka; Patika Kusulaka; Zeionises	Kharahostes (ruled 10 BCE– 10 CE) (Note: An Inscribed Silver Buddhist Reliquary of the Time of King Kharaosta and Prince Indravarman, Richard Salomon, Journal of the American Oriental Society, Vol. 116, No. 3 (Jul. - Sep., 1996), pp. 442); Mujatria	Strato II and Strato III	Hagana
10-20 CE		INDO-PARTHIAN KINGDOM; Gondophares		Indravasu	INDO-PARTHIAN KINGDOM; Gondophares		Rajuvula	
20-30 CE			Ubouzanes; Pakores	Vispavarma (ruled c.0-20 CE) (Note: A Kharosthī Reliquary Inscription of the Time of the Apraca Prince Visnuvarma, by Richard Salomon, South Asian Studies 11 1995, Pages 27-32, Published online: 09 Aug 2010)	Sarpedones		Bhadayasa	Sodasa
30-40 CE			KUSHAN EMPIRE; Kujula Kadphises	Indravarma	Abdagases		...	...
40-45 CE				Aspavarma	Gadana		...	...
45-50 CE				Sasan	Sases		...	...
50-75 CE							...	...
75-100 CE	Indo-Scythian dynasty of the WESTERN SATRAPS; Chastana		Vima Takto				...	...
100-120 CE	Abhiraka		Vima Kadphises				...	...
120 CE	Bhumaka; Nahapana	PARATARAJAS; Yolamira	Kanishka I				Great Satrap Kharapallana and Satrap Vanaspara for Kanishka I	
130-230 CE	Jayadaman; Rudradaman I Damajadasri I Jivadaman; Rudrasimha I Satyadaman; Jivadaman; Rudrasena I	Bagamira; Arjuna; Hvaramira; Mirahvara	Vāsishka (c. 140 – c. 160); Huvishka (c. 160 – c. 190); Vasudeva I (c. 190 – to at least 230)					
230-280 CE	Samghadaman; Damasena; Damajadasri II; Viradaman; Isvaradatta; Yasodaman I Vijayasena; Damajadasri III; Rudrasena II; Visvasimha	Miratakhma; Kozana; Bhimarjuna; Koziya; Datarvharna; Datarvharna	INDO-SASANIANS; Ardashir I, Sassanid king and "Kushanshah" (c. 230 – 250); Peroz I, "Kushanshah" (c. 250 – 265); Hormizd I, "Kushanshah" (c. 265 – 295)			Kanishka II (c. 230 – 240); Vashishka (c. 240 – 250); Kanishka III (c. 250 – 275)		
280-300 CE	Bhratadarman	Datayola II	Hormizd II, "Kushanshah" (c. 295 – 300)			Vasudeva II (c. 275 – 310)		
300-320 CE	Visvasena; Rudrasimha II; Jivadaman		Peroz II, "Kushanshah" (c. 300 – 325)			Vasudeva III; Vasudeva IV; Vasudeva V Chhu (c. 310? – 325)		
320-388 CE	Yasodaman II; Rudradaman II; Rudrasena III; Simhasena; Rudrasena IV		Shapur II Sassanid king and "Kushanshah" (c. 325); Varhran I, Varhran II, Varhran III "Kushanshahs" (c. 325 – 350); Peroz III "Kushanshah" (c. 350 –360); HEPHTHALITE/ HUNAS invasions			Shaka I (c. 325 – 345); Kipunada (c. 345 – 375)		GUPTA EMPIRE; Chandragupta I Samudragupta
388-395 CE	Rudrasimha III		Chandragupta II					
