= Włodzimierz Godłowski =

Polish neurologist and psychologist

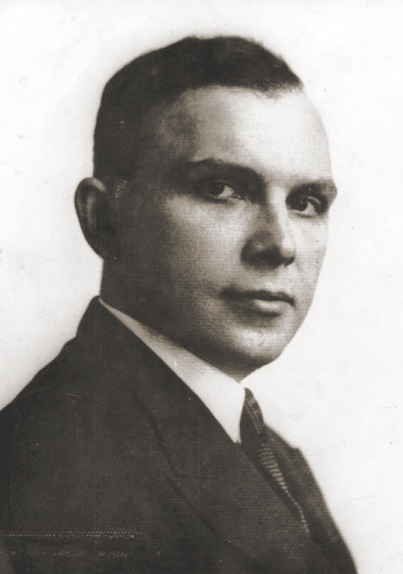
Włodzimierz Józef Godłowski

Włodzimierz Józef Godłowski (7 October 1900 – April/May 1940) was a Polish neurologist and psychologist. A professor of the Stefan Batory University in Wilno (Vilnius), he was also an officer in the Polish Army during the German and Soviet invasion of Poland. He was made a prisoner of war by the Soviets in 1939 and was murdered in the 1940 Katyn massacre.

== Biography ==
Włodzimierz Godłowski was born in Stryi on 7 October 1900. He finished a gymnasium in Sanok in 1918, and then enrolled in the Jagiellonian University in Kraków. Around that time he also served in the military, where he served as a trainee at the Internal Illnesses Clinic. He obtained his PhD in 1925 at the Jagiellonian University, where he also worked as a docent. From 1925-1927 he worked at the Mental Illness Institute in Rybnik. From 1927 he worked in the Neurology Clinic at the Jagiellonian University. In 1930 he spent half a year practicing in Vienna. From September 1938 he was a member of the faculty if the Stefan Batory University in Wilno (Vilnius). He was the director of the University's Neurology Clinic and Brain Institute.

His research concerned issues such as brainstem and cerebral cortex. His best known work was the Podkorowe ośrodki spojrzenia i skojarzonych ruchów oczu (1936)(Subcortical centers of gaze and associated eye movements). It was that work that gained him his habilitation.

As a junior lieutenant of the military reserves of the Polish Army, he was mobilized on 27 August 1939. He served on Poland's eastern frontier, in the "Łużki" Battalion of the "Głębokie" Regiment of the Border Protection Corps. After the German and Soviet invasion of Poland in 1939 he became a prisoner of war in the custody of the Soviet Union. He was imprisoned in Kozielsk, and was a victim of the Katyn massacre in 1940 (around April–May), aged 39.

He was the father of Kazimierz Godłowski, an archeologist and historian.
