= Saraostus =

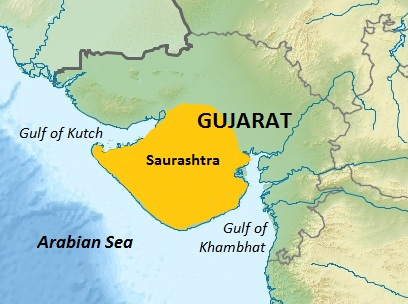
Saurashtra region within Gujarat, India.

Saraostus also called Syrastrene (also Surastrene, modern Saurashtra in India) was the name given by the Greeks to the area of Saurashtra and parts of south-western Gujarat.

"The Greeks ... took possession, not only of Patalena, but also, on the rest of the coast, of what is called the kingdom of Saraostus and Sigerdis. In short, Apollodorus says that Bactriana is the ornament of Ariana as a whole; and, more than that, they extended their empire even as far as the Seres and the Phryni." (Strabo 11.11.1)

An inscription of Ashoka (circa 250 BCE) was discovered on a rock at Girnar, near Junagarh in Saurashtra, showing that the area was controlled by the Mauryas from the capital of Pataliputra.

Saraostus, under the name Surastrene, is also mentioned in the 1st century CE Periplus of the Erythraean Sea:

"Beyond the gulf of Baraca is that of Barygaza and the coast of the country of Ariaca, which is the beginning of the Kingdom of Nambanus and of all India. That part of it lying inland and adjoining Scythia is called Abiria, but the coast is called Syrastrene. It is a fertile country, yielding wheat and rice and sesame oil and clarified butter, cotton and the Indian cloths made therefrom, of the coarser sorts. Very many cattle are pastured there, and the men are of great stature and black in color. The metropolis of this country is Minnagara, from which much cotton cloth is brought down to Barygaza." Periplus, Chap. 41

== See also ==
- Regio Patalis
- Patan
