= Minnagara =

City of the Indo-Scythian kingdom

Minnagara (Ancient Greek: Μινναγάρ and Μιννάγαρα) was a city of the Indo-Scythian kingdom, located on the Indus river in Pakistan, north of the coastal city of Barbaricum, North and West of Barygaza.

Minagara as mentioned in Periplus of the Erythraean Sea

Minnagara is mentioned in the 1st century CE Periplus of the Erythraean Sea:

"Beyond this region (Gedrosia), the continent making a wide curve from the east across the depths of the bays, there follows the coast district of Scythia, which lies above toward the north; the whole marshy; from which flows down the river Sinthus, the greatest of all the rivers that flow into the Erythraean Sea, bringing down an enormous volume of water (...) This river has seven mouths, very shallow and marshy, so that they are not navigable, except the one in the middle; at which by the shore, is the market-town, Barbaricum. Before it there lies a small island, and inland behind it is the metropolis of Scythia, Minnagara; it is subject to Parthian princes who are constantly driving each other out."

A second Minnagara is mentioned in the Periplus, which seems to be upstream of Barigaza:

41. "Beyond the gulf of Baraca is that of Barygaza and the coast of the country of Ariaca, which is the beginning of the Kingdom of Nambanus, That part of it lying inland and adjoining Scythia is called Abiria, but the coast is called Syrastrene. It is a fertile country, yielding wheat and rice and sesame oil and clarified butter, cotton and the Indian cloths made therefrom, of the coarser sorts. Very many cattle are pastured there, and the men are of great stature and black in color. The metropolis of this country is Minnagara, from which much cotton cloth is brought down to Barygaza."

— Periplus of the Erythraean Sea, Chap. 41

Ptolemy also mentioned Minnagara, which, according to his explanations, would be along the Narmada River, upstream of Barigaza, and below Ujjain:

Moreover the region (in Pakistan) which is next to the western part of India, is called Scythia. A part of this region around the (Indus) river mouth is Patalena, above which is Abiria. That which is about the mouth of the Indus and the Canthicolpus bay is called Syrastrena. (...) In the island formed by this river are the cities Pantala, Barbaria. (...) The Larica region of Scythia is located eastward from the swamp near the sea, in which on the west of the Namadus river is the interior city of Barygaza emporium. On the east side of the river (...) Ozena-Regia Tiastani (...) Minnagara".

— Ptolemy Geographia, Book Seven, Chapter I

Minnagara may be identical with the Manjábarí of the Arab geographers.

Alternatively, "Nagara" being the Sanskrit word for "town", the city itself may have been called "Min", a name found in Isidorus of Charax as a Scythian city in Sakastan (Lassen).

== See also ==
- Maheshwar
- Krokola
- Kolachi (port)
- Debal
- Bhambore
- Barbarice
- Periplus of the Erythraean Sea
- Oraea
- Barbarikon
