= Mark Shchukin =

Polish archaeologist

- Born: 14 October 1937; Leningrad, Soviet Union
- Died: 14 July 2008 (aged 70); St. Petersburg, Russia

Academic work
- Discipline: Archaeology
- Institutions: Saint Petersburg State University

Mark Borisovich Shchukin (10 October 1937 – 14 July 2008) was a Russian archaeologist. He was Professor of Archaeology at the Saint Petersburg State University and a researcher on archaeology at the Hermitage Museum and the Russian Academy of Sciences. He was also a corresponding member at the German Archaeological Institute. Shchukin specialized in the study of the Iron Age cultures of Eastern Europe and their interaction with the classical world.

== See also ==
- Roger Batty
