= East-Central Europe =

Geopolitical subregion of Europe

East-Central Europe is a geopolitical term that primarily encompasses Croatia, the Czech Republic, Hungary, Lithuania, Poland, Slovakia, and Slovenia. The area is bordered by East Slavic countries to the east and Germanic-speaking countries to the west.

The concept differs from that of Central and Eastern Europe, which is based on criteria whereby the states of Central and Eastern Europe belong to two different geographical regions of Europe.

== Definitions ==
=== Oskar Halecki ===
In the 1950s, Oskar Halecki, who distinguished four regions in Europe (Western, West Central, East Central, and Eastern Europe), defined East-Central Europe as a region from Finland to Greece, "the eastern part of Central Europe, between Sweden, Germany, and Italy, on the one hand, and Turkey and Russia on the other". According to Halecki:

In the course of European history, a great variety of peoples in this region created their own independent states, sometimes quite large and powerful; in connection with Western Europe they developed their individual national cultures and contributed to the general progress of European civilization.

=== Paul Robert Magocsi ===
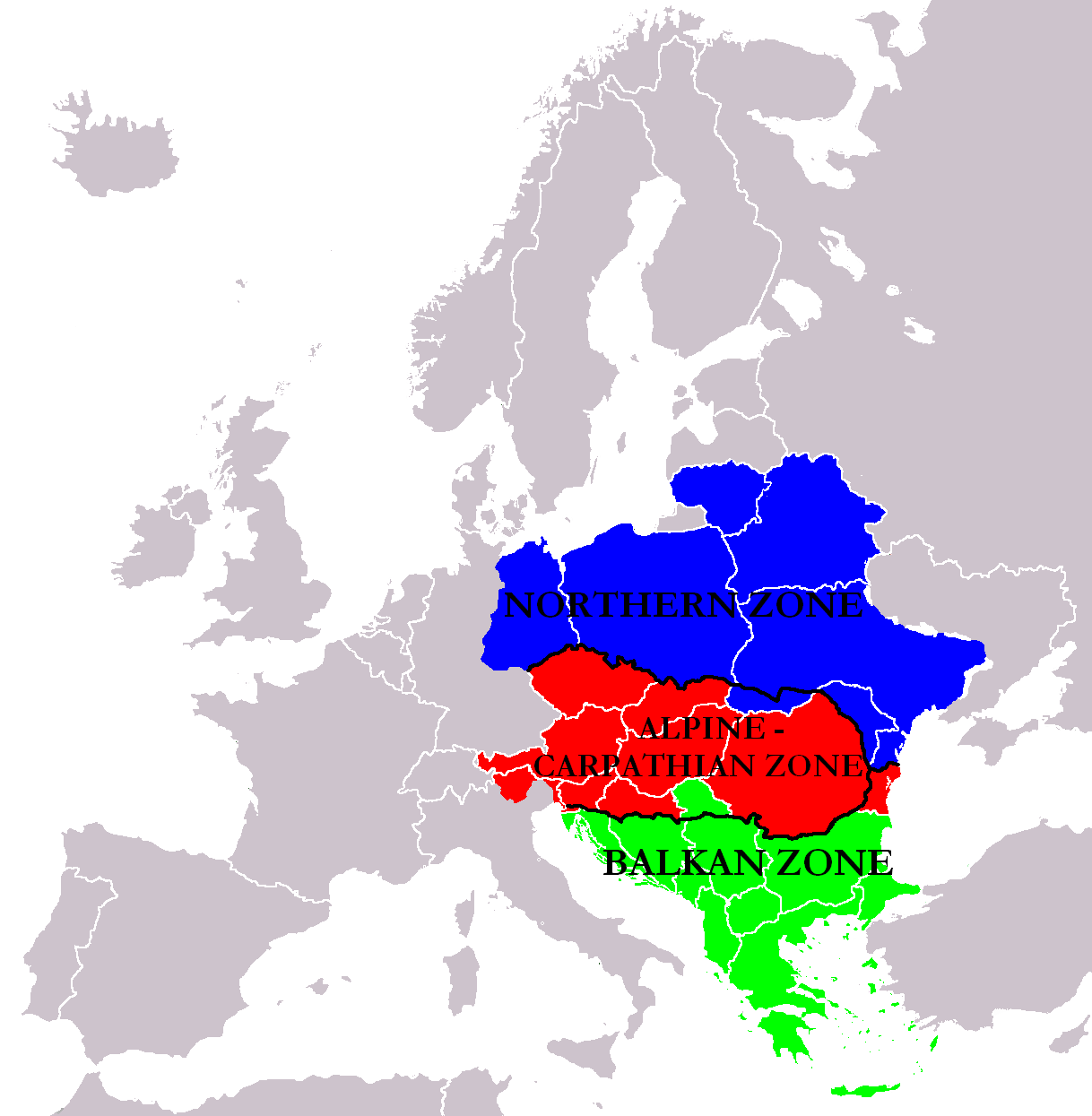
Paul Robert Magocsi's rendition and interpretation of Central Europe.

Paul Robert Magocsi described this region in his work Historical Atlas of East Central Europe. His idea distinguished Central Europe into 3 main zones:

- The northern zone, located between the Baltic Sea (in the north) and the alignment Ore Mountains-Sudetes-northern Carpathians-Prut river (in the south) and the Dnieper in the east. The countries located by the author in this zone are: Belarus, former East Germany, Lithuania, Moldova, Poland, and Ukraine (west of the Dnieper river) – this area roughly coincides with the former Polish–Lithuanian Commonwealth (minus the eastern part of Moldavia, designated later as Bessarabia).
- The Alpine-Carpathian zone, located on the south of the northern zone, bordered in the south by the rivers Kupa-Sava-Danube. This area comprises the Pannonian Basin, and roughly coincides with the former Habsburg Empire before the mid nineteenth century and the Danubian Principalities (Wallachia and Moldavia). The countries located by the author in this zone are Austria, Croatia, Czech Republic, Hungary, northeastern Italy, Romania, Serbia (north of Sava and Danube), Slovakia, and Slovenia.
- The Balkan zone, located on the south of the Alpine-Carpathian zone and matching with the Balkan Peninsula. The countries located by the author in this zone are: Albania, Bosnia and Herzegovina, Bulgaria, Greece, Montenegro, North Macedonia, Central Serbia, and European Turkey.

==== United Nations ====
United Nations Group of Experts on Geographical Names (UNGEGN) was set up to consider the technical problems of domestic standardization of geographical names. The Group is composed of experts from various linguistic/geographical divisions that have been established at the UN Conferences on the Standardization of Geographical Names.

- Baltic Division: Estonia, Latvia, Lithuania, Poland and Russia.
- East-Central and South-East Europe Division:As the name shows, it is combination of two different groups of countries Albania, Bosnia and Herzegovina, Bulgaria, Croatia, Cyprus, Czech Republic, Georgia, Greece, Hungary, Montenegro, North Macedonia, Poland, Romania, Serbia, Slovakia, Slovenia, European Turkey, and Ukraine.
- Eastern Europe, Northern and Central Asia Division: Armenia, Azerbaijan, Belarus, Georgia, Kazakhstan, Kyrgyzstan, Russia, Tajikistan, Turkmenistan, Ukraine and Uzbekistan.
- Romano-Hellenic Division: Andorra, Belgium, Cyprus, France, Greece, Holy See, Italy, Luxembourg, Moldova, Monaco, Portugal, Romania, Spain, Switzerland and European Turkey.

=== Academic institutions ===
Jagiellonian Europe in the 15th century: Bohemia, Hungary and the Polish–Lithuanian Commonwealth

- International Federation of the Institutes of East-Central Europe has four institutes in its structure (Lublin, Prague, Bratislava, and Vilnius) and includes over a hundred members from Belarus, Croatia, Czech Republic, Hungary, Lithuania, Poland, Slovakia, Slovenia, and Ukraine. The institutes were established successively after 1990, with a secretariat in Lublin, to stimulate the debate on the issue of Central European space between the East and the West. This experience of cooperation – from the very beginning open for representatives of other East-Central European nation-States as well as Russians, Germans and Jews – allowed creation of the Joint Committee of UNESCO and International Committee of Historical Sciences (ICHS). The first president of the committee was Jerzy Kłoczowski, long-time member of the UNESCO Executive Council and president of the Institute of East-Central Europe in Lublin. The committee's 10 meetings (in Paris, Lublin, Oslo and Sydney) were devoted to East-Central Europe. The Federation maintains official relations with UNESCO.
- East Central European Center at Columbia University was established "to promote the study of the countries lying between Germany and Russia and between the Baltic and Aegean seas". Its program covers Albania, Austria, Belarus, Bosnia and Herzegovina, Bulgaria, Croatia, the Czech Republic, Estonia, Hungary, Latvia, Lithuania, Moldova, Montenegro, North Macedonia, Poland, Romania, Serbia, Slovakia, Slovenia, and Ukraine.
- CEEM (Centre for the Study of Median Europe) defines Median Europe as an area situated between Germany and Russia, from the Baltic region to the Balkans. The centre conducts its research on 18 European cultures: Bosnian, Bulgarian, Croatian, Czech, Estonian, Finnish, Hungarian, Latvian, Lithuanian, Montenegrin, Macedonian, Polish, Romanian, Serbian, Slovak, Slovenian, Sorbian, and Ukrainian.
- Utrecht Studies in Medieval Literacy at Utrecht University has defined East Central Europe as 'the region within the historical boundaries of [the] late medieval kingdoms of Bohemia, Hungary and the Polish–Lithuanian Commonwealth.'

=== Other contributors ===
- Michael Foucher defined Middle Europe as "an intermediate geopolitical space between the West and Russia, a space of historical transitions between these two organizational poles; political and territorial heirs imposed from the East, i.e. Kremlin; nowadays streamlining process imposed by the West". According to this author, the following sub-regions form Median (Middle) Europe:
  - in the North – Central Europe stricto sensu (Croatia, Czech Republic, Hungary, Poland, Slovakia, and Slovenia)
  - in the South – Albania, Bosnia and Herzegovina, Bulgaria, Romania, Serbia, the region "overflows towards Belarus and Ukraine" (despite the obvious geographical distance from both)
  - Greece is cited as not being a part of Median Europe but playing an important role there
- Daniel Călin – In the Final Report NATO and the EU in the Balkans – a Comparison prepared by Romanian NATO Fellow Daniel Călin, three sub-regions of Middle Europe are distinguished:
  - Northern Middle Europe (Estonia, Latvia and Lithuania – the Baltic States)
  - Central Europe stricto sensu (Czech Republic, Hungary, Poland, and Slovakia)
  - Southeast Europe (Albania, Bosnia and Herzegovina, Bulgaria, Croatia, Serbia, Montenegro, North Macedonia, Romania, Slovenia, plus the continental parts of Greece and European Turkey)

Southeast Europe is distinguished from the Balkans, defined as the region consisting of Albania, Bosnia and Herzegovina, Bulgaria, Croatia, Greece, Montenegro, North Macedonia, Romania, Serbia, and Slovenia.

=== Narrow definition ===
East-Central Europe is sometimes defined as the eastern part of Central Europe and is limited to the member states of the Visegrád Group – Czechia, Hungary, Poland, and Slovakia. This definition is close to the German concept of de:Ostmitteleuropa.

== See also ==
- Central Europe
- Eastern Europe
- Mitteleuropa
- Old Europe and New Europe
- Visegrád Group
- West-Central Europe (in German)
- Western Europe
