= Barbaricum =

Geographical name used by historical and archaeological experts

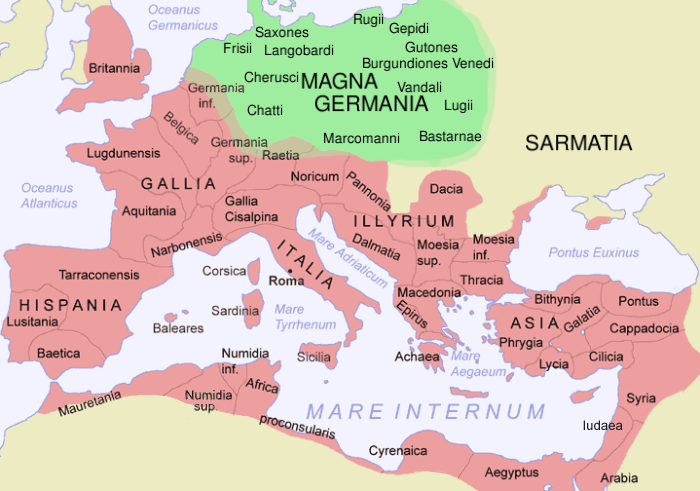
Roman provinces in 116 AD with the adjacent land of Magna Germania

Barbaricum (from the Greek: Βαρβαρικόν, "foreign", "barbarian") is a geographical name used by historical and archaeological experts to refer to the vast area of barbarian-occupied territory that lay, in Roman times, beyond the frontiers or limites of the Roman Empire in North, Central and South Eastern Europe, the "lands lying beyond Roman administrative control but nonetheless a part of the Roman world". During the Late Antiquity, it was the Latin name for those tribal territories not occupied by Rome that lay beyond the Rhine and the Danube (but not for Persia): Ammianus Marcellinus used it, as did Eutropius. The earliest recorded mention appears to date to the early 3rd century.

In research literature, the terms 'Germania', actually Magna Germania, and 'Barbaricum' are sometimes used interchangeably, but they are not entirely identical in the chronological or the geographical senses. The extra-Roman area described as Barbaricum was, from the beginning of the Migration Period, not exclusively inhabited by Germani, even though they represented the majority of the population until the time of Late Antiquity. In the Migration Period, Alans and Huns also pushed forward into this area before and, later (from the 6th century), Slavic tribes populated the area east of the Albis (River Elbe) that the Germani had largely abandoned.

It is important to highlight the diverse cultural, social and economic contacts between (Germanic) Barbaricum and the Empire since the early imperial period. Archaeologically, numerous imported Roman artefacts have been uncovered among the finds in the Barbaricum region. The formation of major Germanic tribal units such as the Alemanni and Franks, from the time of the imperial crisis of the 3rd century was probably influenced by contact with the Roman world. Likewise, "barbarians" were able to have careers in the Roman army.

== Literature ==
- Heinrich Beck (ed.): Zur Geschichte der Gleichung "germanisch-deutsch". Berlin, 2004.
- Hans Jürgen Eggers: Der römische Import im freien Germanien. Atlas Urgesch. 1, Hamburg, 1951.
- Guy Halsall: Barbarian Migrations and the Roman West, 376–568. Cambridge, 2007.
- Gustav Adolf Lehmann: Imperium und Barbaricum. Neue Befunde und Erkenntnisse zu den römisch-germanischen Auseinandersetzungen im nordwestdeutschen Raum – von der augusteischen Okkupationsphase bis zum Germanien-Zug des Maximinus Thrax (235 n. Chr.). Vienna, 2011.
- Ulla Lund Hansen: Römische Kaiserzeit. In: Reallexikon der Germanischen Altertumskunde. Vol. 25 (2003), pp. 90ff.
- Walter Pohl: Die Germanen. 2nd edn. Munich, 2004.
- Tadeusz Sarnowski: Barbaricum und ein bellum Bosporanum in einer Inschrift aus Preslav. In: Zeitschrift für Papyrologie und Epigraphik 87 (1991), pp. 137–144.
- Helmuth Schneider (ed.): Feindliche Nachbarn. Rom und die Germanen. Böhlau Verlag, Cologne, 2008, ISBN 978-3-412-20219-4.
