= Kalachuris of Mahishmati =

Early Medieval dynasty in central India (550–625)

Kalachuri
- 550–625
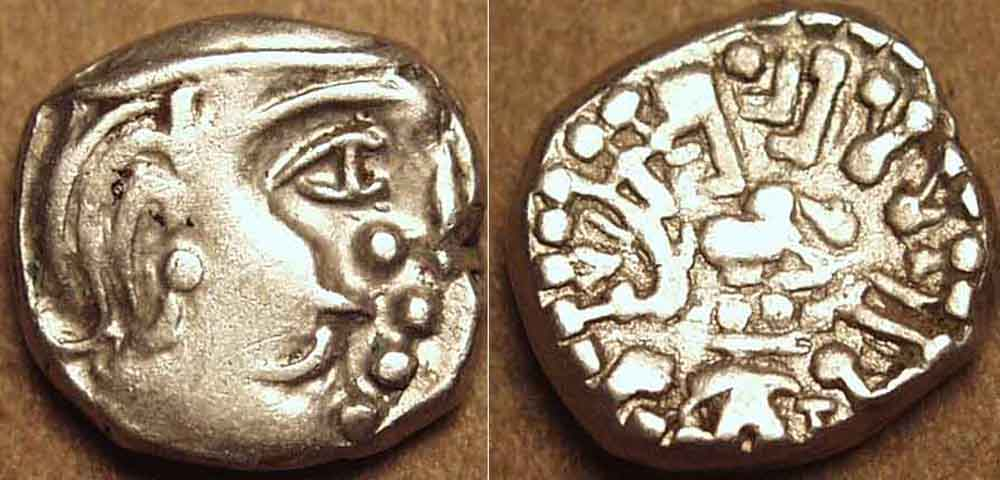
- Silver coin of king Krishnaraja (r. c. 550–575) of the Kalachuri dynasty, on the model of the Western Satraps.

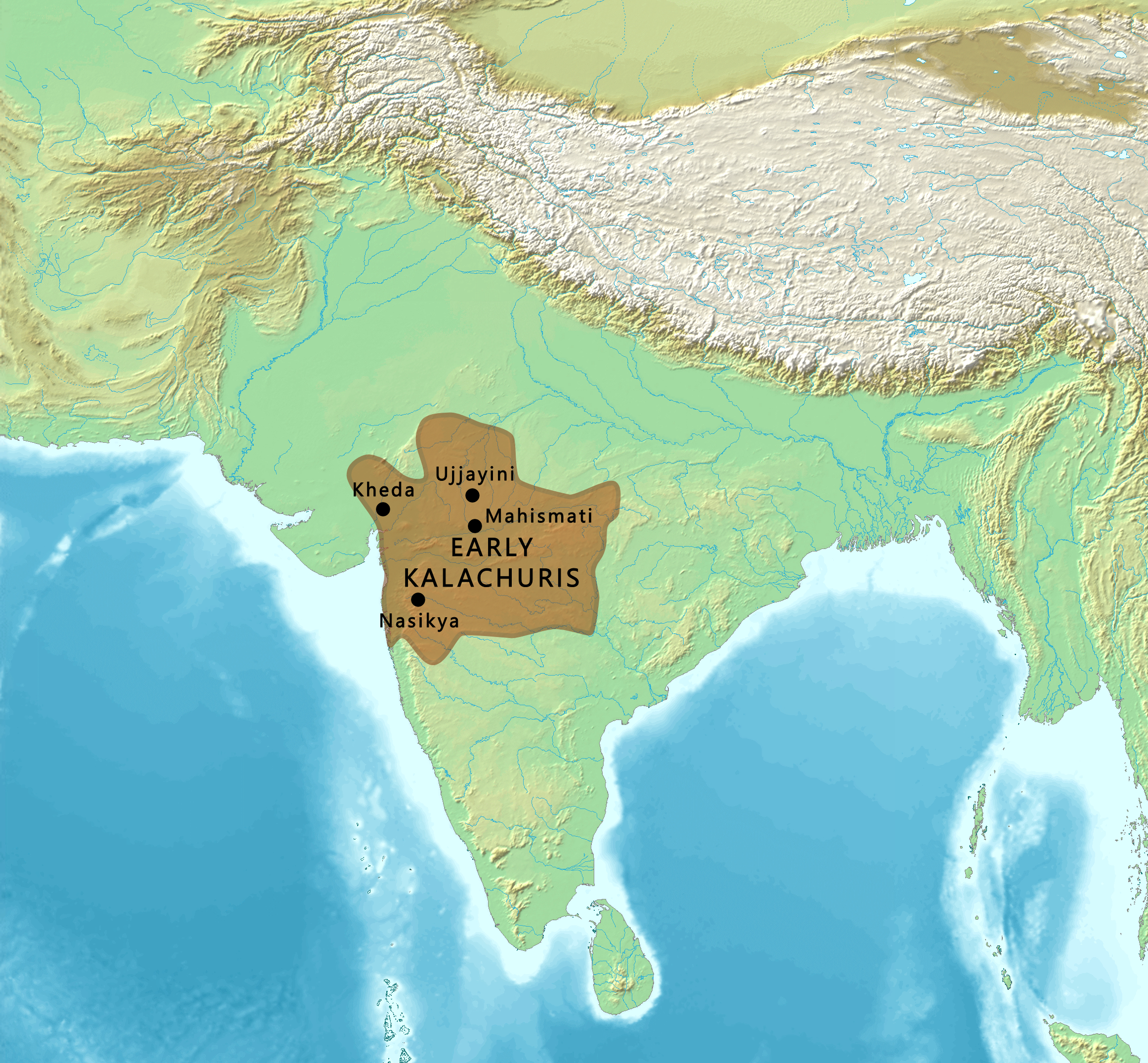
- Map of the Kalachuris of Mahishmati circa 600 CE.
- Capital: Mahishmati
- Common languages: Sanskrit
- Religion: Hinduism
- Government: Monarchy
- King
  - 550–575: Krishnaraja
  - 575–600: Shankaragana
  - 600–625: Buddharaja
Preceded by	Succeeded by
Vakataka dynasty	Chalukya dynasty
- Today part of: India

The Kalachuris of Mahismati, or the Early Kalachuris, were an early medieval Indian dynasty that ruled present-day Maharashtra, as well as parts of mainland Gujarat and southern Madhya Pradesh. Their capital was located at Mahishmati. Epigraphic and numismatic evidence suggests that the earliest of the Ellora and Elephanta cave monuments were built during the Kalachuri rule.

The origin of the dynasty is uncertain. In the 6th century, the Kalachuris gained control of the territories formerly ruled by the Guptas, the Vakatakas and the Vishnukundinas. Only three Kalachuri kings are known from inscriptional evidence: Shankaragana, Krishnaraja, and Buddharaja. The Kalachuris lost their power to the Chalukyas of Vatapi in the 7th century. One theory connects the later Kalachuri dynasties of Tripuri and Kalyani to the Kalachuris of Mahishmati.

== Origin ==
The origin of the Kalachuris is uncertain. In inscriptions, they are variously known as Kalachuri, Kalatsuri, and Katatchuri. Some historical records — such as the 7th-8th century records of their southern neighbours, the Chalukyas also call them Haihayas although the Kalachuris of Mahishmati do not call themselves by this name in any of their extant records. It is possible that Kalachuris came to be known as Haihayas simply because their capital was Mahishmati, which — according to Puranic tradition — had been established by Haihaya ruler Mahismanta. According to RC Majumdar, Kalachuris used the era of 248-249 CE, which later was called Chedi Era, however they seem to have adopted that era after the conquest of Lata and Nashik region. This is suggested by the use of Gupta era in earlier grants. The later Kalachuris of Tripuri called themselves Haihayas, and traced their ancestry to the legendary Haihaya ruler Kartavirya Arjuna.

Some earlier scholars, such as D.R. Bhandarkar, proposed a foreign origin for the Kalachuris. For example, Bhandarkar argues that according to the Puranic tradition, the Haihayas took help from foreign-origin tribes such as the Shakas, the Yavanas, and the Khasas. Bhandarkar therefore presumes that the Haihayas (from whom the Kalachuris claimed origin) were also a foreign tribe. Later scholars have rejected this theory.

== Territory ==
Find spots of the inscriptions issued by the Kalachuris of Mahishmati (map of India)

According to the Kalachuri inscriptions, the dynasty controlled Abhona, Sankheda, Sarsavani and Vadner. Literary references suggest that their capital was located at Mahishmati in the Malwa region.

The dynasty also controlled Vidarbha, where they succeeded the Vakataka and the Vishnukundina dynasties.

In addition, the Kalachuris conquered northern Konkan (around Elephanta) by the mid-6th century. Here, they succeeded the Traikutaka dynasty.

The second Kalachuri king Shankaragana took control over Ujjain around 597 from Mahasenagupta of Malwa. Around 608, the third Kalachuri king Buddharaja took control over Vidisha, following the end of later Gupta rule in Malwa after the defeat of Devagupta of Malwa by Rajyavardhana of Kannauj in 605.

== History ==
=== Krishnaraja ===
Krishnaraja (r. c. 550-575) is the earliest known Kalachuri ruler, and probably established the dynasty with its capital at Mahishmati. The political situation in the region around 550 CE likely favoured him: the death of Yashodharman left a political vacuum in Malwa, the Vakataka rule had ended in Maharashtra, and the Maitraka power was declining in Gujarat.

==== Coins of Krishnaraja ====
Krishnaraja's coins have been found at several places from Rajasthan in north to Satara district in the south, and from Mumbai (Salsette) in the west to Amaravati district in the east. These coins seem to have remained in circulation for nearly 150 years after his death, as evident from the 710-711 CE (Kalachuri year 461) Anjaneri copper plate inscription of Bhogashakti, which calls them "Krishnaraja-rupaka". Therefore, it is not certain if Krishnaraja's rule extended over this entire territory, or if these coins traveled to distant places after his death.

Krishnaraja's extant coins are all of silver, round in shape, and 29 grains in weight. They imitate the design of the coins issued by the earlier dynasties including the Western Kshatrapas, the Traikutakas, and the Guptas. The obverse features a bust of the king facing right, and the reverse features a figure of Nandi, the bull vahana of the Hindu god Shiva. The Nandi design is based on the coins issued by the Gupta king Skandagupta.

A Brahmi script legend describing the king as a devotee of Shiva (Parama-maheshvara) surrounds the Nandi figure on his coins. An inscription of his son Shankaragana also describes him as a devotee of Pashupati (an aspect of Shiva) since his birth. Historical evidence suggests that he may have commissioned the Shaivite monuments at the Elephanta Caves and the earliest of the Brahmanical caves at Ellora, where his coins have been discovered.

=== Shankaragana ===
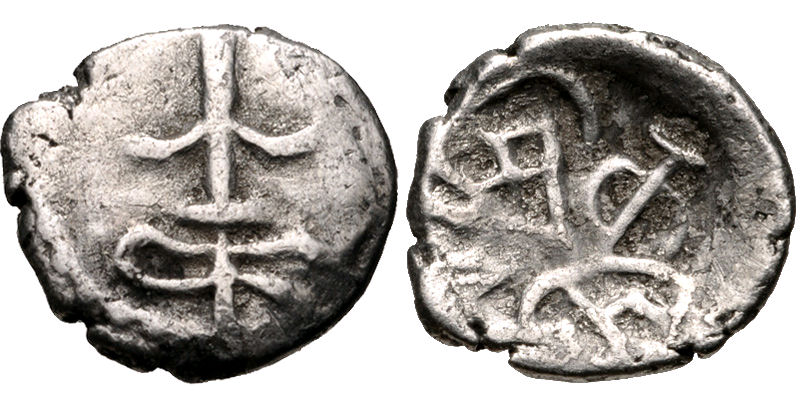
Coin of King Kalahasila, a Kalachuri feudatory. Circa (575-610).

Krishnaraja's son Shankaragana ruled during c. 575–600 CE. He is the earliest ruler of the dynasty to be attested by inscriptions from his own reign, which were issued from Ujjain and Nirgundipadraka. He is thought to have warred against the king Mahasenagupta who ruled Malwa after having been ridden of the rest of his empire in Magadha by the king of Kannauj.

Shankaragana's 597 CE (Kalachuri Era 347) inscription, found at Abhona and issued from his camp at Ujjayini (present-day Ujjain), is the earliest epigraphic record of the Kalachuri dynasty. It records his grant of a land in Bhoga-vardhana (present-day Bhokardan) to a Brahmin from Kallivana (in present-day Nashik district). This suggests that Shankaragana invaded the Malwa kingdom of the Later Gupta king Mahasenagupta, who likely moved to Vidisha during this period.

The Abhona inscription describes Shankaragana as the lord of a vast territory extending from the western ocean to eastern ocean. Another inscription, found at Sankhera and issued by Shankaragana's military officer Shantilla from his "victorious camp" at Nirgundipadraka (in present-day central Gujarat). This confirms that Gujarat on the western coast was part of his territory. He adopted the titles of the Gupta emperor Skandagupta, which suggests that he conquered western Malwa, which was formerly under the Gupta authority. Abhona is in present-day Maharashtra, which suggests that his empire extended from Malwa in the north to northern Maharashtra in the south.

Like his father, Shankaragana described himself as a Parama-Maheshvara (devotee of Shiva). According to K. P. Jayaswal, king Gana-shankara mentioned in the 8th century text Arya-manju-shri-mula-kalpa, may be identified with the Kalachuri king Shankara-gana.

=== Buddharaja ===
Buddharaja succeeded his father Shankaragana around 600 CE, and is the last known ruler of the early Kalachuri dynasty.

During Buddharaja's reign, the Chalukya king Mangalesha attacked the Kalachuri kingdom from the south. Mangalesha's Mahakuta and Nerur inscriptions record his victory over the Kalachuris. The invasion did not result in a complete conquest, as evident by Buddharaja's 609-610 CE (360 KE) Vadner and 610-611 CE (361 KE) Sarsavani grants, described as having been issued from his "victorious" camps at Vidisha and Anandapura respectively. The Vadner-Vidisha inscription records the grant of a village situated in the Vata-nagara (modern Vadner) subdivision, while the Sarsavani-Anandapura inscription records the grant of a village in the present-day Bharuch area. The inscriptions, issued around two and a half month apart, indicate that the Buddharaja controlled the territory between Anandapura in the east to Vidisha in the west, and that the king had to march from Vidisha to Anandapura during this period. This suggests that Budharaja had taken control over Malwa in 608 that had earlier been under the rule of the Later Gupta king Devagupta who was defeated by Rajyavardhana of Kannauj.

According to one theory, Mangalesha could not consolidate his gains against the Kalachuris because of rebellions, first by his subordinate Svamiraja and then by Pulakeshin II. Buddharaja probably lost his sovereignty during a second Chalukya invasion, by Mangalesha, or by his nephew Pulakeshin II. According to one theory, Mangalesha was the Chalukya ruler responsible for ending the Kalachuri power as his inscriptions mention his victory over the Kalachuris, while no inscriptions credit Pulakeshin with this achievement. According to another theory, Pulakeshin's Aihole inscription alludes to his victory over Buddharaja: the inscription states that Pulakeshin conquered Konkana and the "three Maharashtras", which probably refers to the territories of the Kalachuris and their feudatories. The unnamed adversary referred to in this inscription may have been Buddharaja.

By 630 CE, the Nashik area - formerly part of the Kalachuri kingdom - was under Chalukya control, as Pulakeshin's inscription records his village grants in this region. This suggests that the Buddharaja's reign ended sometime before 630 CE.

The Chinese traveler Xuanzang, who visited India during c. 639–645 CE, describes a king named Shiladitya as the ruler of the Malwa region in central India. Based on this, some scholars have theorized that the Maitraka king Shiladitya I alias Dharmaditya conquered Malwa from Buddharaja. However, a large numbers of scholars dispute this theory in absence of concrete evidence.

Like his father and grandfather, Buddharaja described himself as a Parama-Maheshvara (devotee of Shiva). His queen Ananta-Mahayi belonged to the Pashupata sect.

=== Descendants ===
No concrete information is available about the successors of Buddharaja, but it is possible that the Kalachuris continued to rule at Mahishmati. A 687 CE inscription of the Chalukya king Vinayaditya suggests that the Kalachuris had become Chalukya feudatories by this time. The Chalukya inscriptions suggest that the two dynasties may have established matrimonial relations in the later years.

An inscription issued by a prince named Taralasvamin was found at Sankheda (where one of Shankaragana's grants was also found). This inscription describes Taralasvamin as a devotee of Shiva, and his father Maharaja Nanna as a member of the "Katachchuri" family. The inscription is dated to the year 346 of an unspecified era. Assuming the era as Kalachuri era, Taralasvamin would have been a contemporary of Shankaragana. However, Taralasvamin and Nanna are not mentioned in other Kalachuri records. Also, unlike other Kalachuri inscriptions, the date in this inscription is mentioned in decimal numbers. Moreover, some expressions in the inscription appear to have been borrowed from the 7th century Sendraka inscriptions. Because of these evidences, V. V. Mirashi considered Taralasvamin's inscription as a spurious one.

V. V. Mirashi connected the Kalachuris of Tripuri to the early Kalachuri dynasty. He theorizes that the early Kalachuris moved their capital from Mahishmati to Kalanjara, and from there to Tripuri.

== Cultural contributions ==
=== Elephanta ===
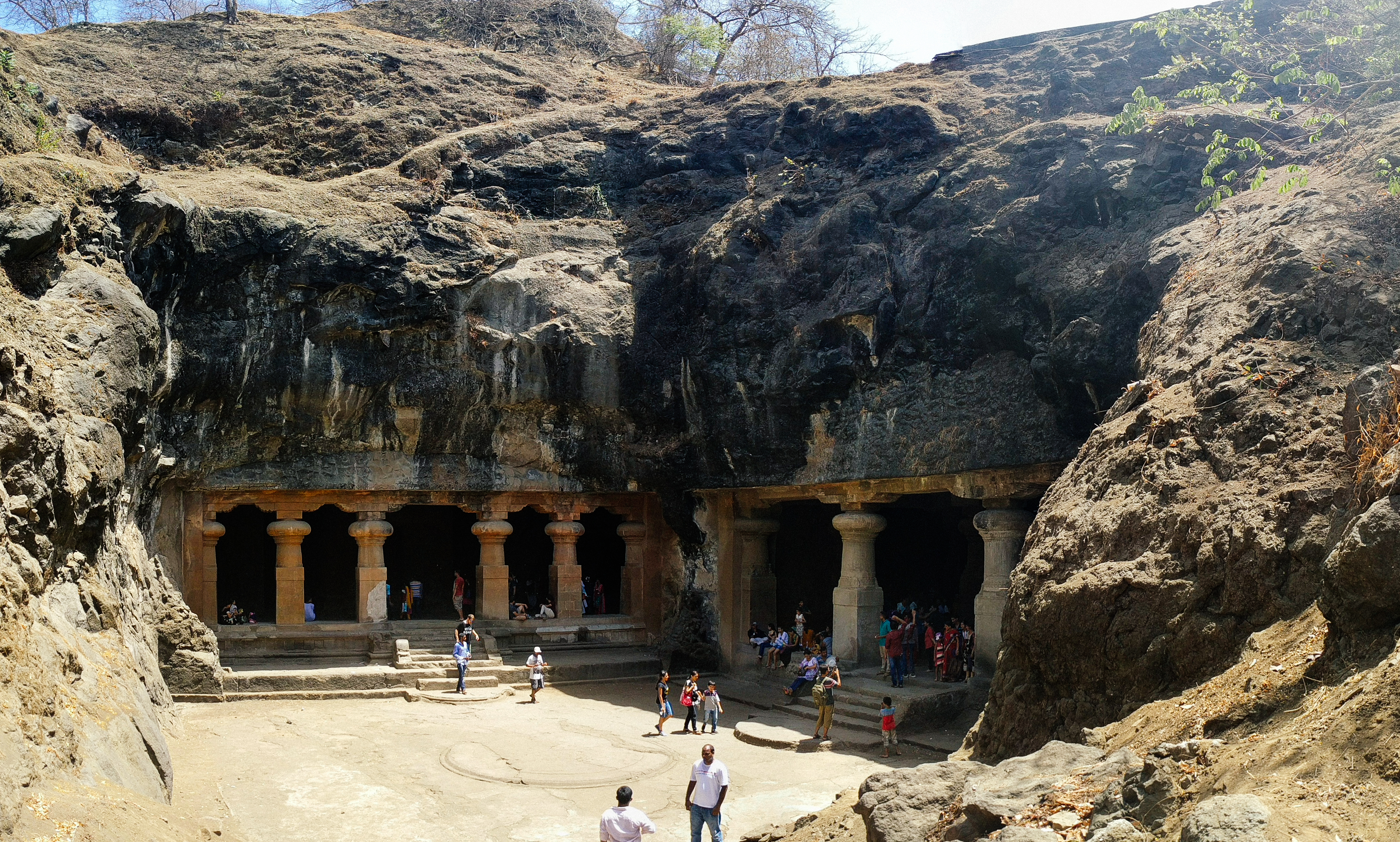
Elephanta Caves

The Elephanta Caves which contain Shaivite monuments are located along the Konkan coast, on the Elephanta Island near Mumbai. Historical evidence suggests that these monuments are associated with Krishnaraja, who was also a Shaivite.

The Kalachuris appear to have been the rulers of the Konkan coast, when some of the Elephanta monuments were built. Silver coins of Krishnaraja have been found along the Konkan coast, on the Salsette Island (now part of Mumbai) and in the Nashik district. Around 31 of his copper coins have been found on the Elephanta Island, which suggests that he was the patron of the main cave temple on the island. According to numismatist Shobhana Gokhale, these low-value coins may have been used to pay the wages of the workers involved in the cave excavation.

=== Ellora ===
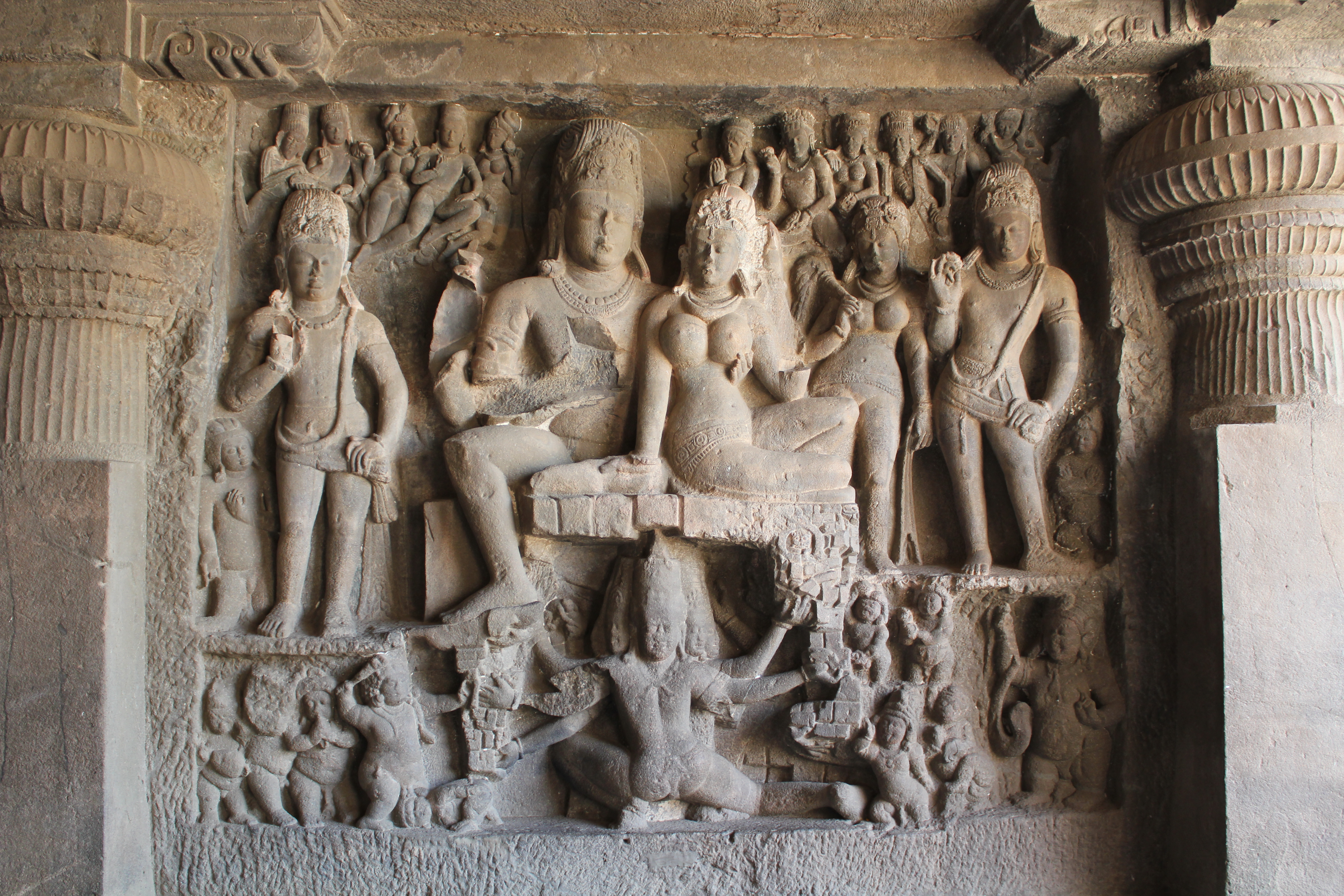
Ellora Cave No. 29

The earliest of the Hindu caves at Ellora appear to have been built during the Kalachuri reign, and possibly under Kalachuri patronage. For example, the Ellora Cave No. 29 shows architectural and iconographic similarities with the Elephanta Caves. The earliest coin found at Ellora, in front of Cave No. 21 (Rameshvara), was issued by Krishnaraja.

== Rulers ==
The following are the known rulers of the Kalachuri dynasty of Malwa with their estimated reigns (IAST names in brackets):

- Krishnaraja (Kṛṣṇarāja), r. c. 550–575 CE
- Shankaragana (Śaṃkaragaṇa), r. c. 575–600 CE
- Buddharaja (Buddharāja), r. c. 600–625 CE

== See also ==
- Kalachuri Era founded by Ishwarsena, used by the Kalachuris and so named after them
- Abhira
- Elephanta Cave
