= Abhira =

Abhira may refer to:

- Abhira people, an ancient Indian tribe, mentioned in ancient Indian literature such as the Mahabharata
  - Abhira kingdom, an ancient Indian kingdom of these people
- Abhira dynasty, a 3rd-century dynasty of South India
- Abhira-Gupta dynasty, a 6th century kingdom in Nepal

== See also ==
- Ahir, also Abhir, a social community of India
