= History of Nashik =

Nashik is a historically, mythologically, socially and culturally important city in the northern part of the state of Maharashtra in India. It is known for the temples on the banks of the Godavari and it has historically been one of the holy sites of the Hindu religion. It is one of the four cities that hosts the massive Sinhastha Kumbh Mela once every twelve years.

== A historical perspective ==
Nashik was known by different names in different Yugas. According to Hindu legends, It was known as "Padmanagar" during Satya Yuga, "Trikantak" during Treta Yuga, "Janasthana" during Dvapara Yuga, and ultimately "Navashikh" or "Nashik" during Kali Yuga. During the Mughal period it was known as "Gulshanabad", the city of roses. Nashik has mythological, historical, social and cultural importance. The city is situated on the banks of the Godavari River, making it one of the holiest places for Hindus all over the world. According to Hindu mythology, Lord Rama, the King of Ayodhya, made Nashik his abode during his 14 years in exile. At the same place Lord Laxman, by the wish of Lord Rama, cut the nose of "Shurpanakha" and thus this city was named as "Nasik" as the word Nasik means "nose" in Sanskrit.

After the fall of the Satavahana empire, the Abhiras or Ahirs ruled in the north east and the Chutus in Maharashtra and Kuntala. The Puranas state that ten Abhira tribes ruled for 67 years. The Nashik inscription speaks of king Madhuriputra Ishvarasena, the Abhir and a son of Shivadatla. This dynasty originated in 249–250 CE, an era called Kalachuri or Chedi in later times.

Classical Sanskrit poets like Valmiki, Kālidāsa and Bhavabhuti have paid rich tributes here. In 150 BCE Nashik was the country's largest market place. From 1487 CE, the province came under the rule of Mughals and its name was changed Gulshanabad (No such proofs for this name). It was also home of Emperor Akbar who wrote at length about Nashik in Ein-e-Akbari. It was also known as the 'Land of the Brave' during the regime of Maratha Emperor Shivaji.

The most important historical significance is that Kumbh Mela is conducted at Nashik once every twelve years, out of 4 places in India.

== Ancient Nashik ==
Legend states that the name "Nashik" is derived from the Hindu epic Ramayana. During the exile of Lord Ram, Shoorpanakha, the sister of the demon king Raavan tried to seduce Ram. Angered, Ram ordered Lakshman to cut off Shoorpanakha's nose (nashika/naak). According to the Raamayan, Sita was abducted by Raavan from the area called Panchavati in the Western Ghats. Today, it is a popular religious destination within the city limits.

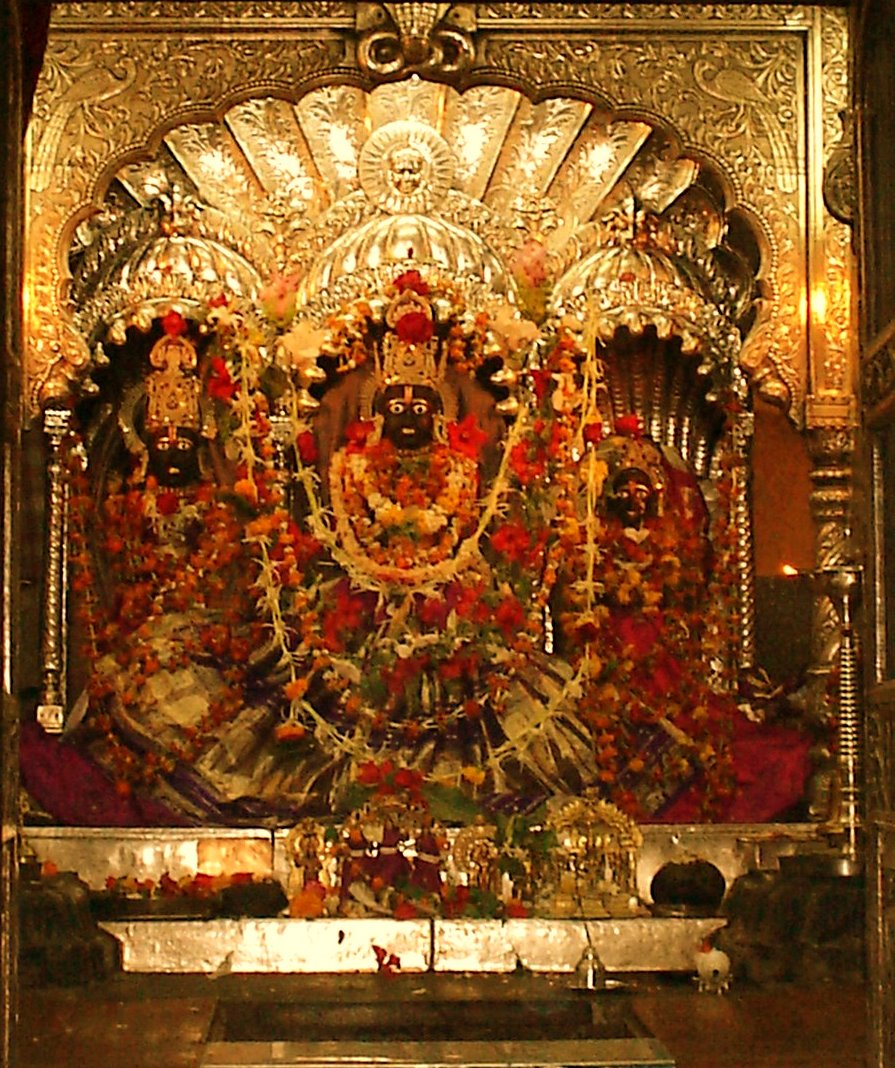
Idols of Rama, Lakshman, Seeta at a temple in Nashik.

The city got its present name in 1818, when the Peshwas got control of the city. The Peshwa rule however, did not last long and the British captured Nashik in the very same year. In 1840, one of the first modern libraries of Maharashtra (then, the Presidency of Bombay) was founded at Nashik.

=== Mauryan Dynasty ===
Nashik region was included in Mauryan Kingdom, as per inscription issued by Dharma Maha Matra of Ashoka found at Devtek in Chandrapur district. The inscription states capturing and killing of animals. Also rock-edicts of Ashoka mention the Rashtrika (Rashtrakuta dynasty)-Petenikas and the Bhoja-Petenikas. According to many scholars, Petenikas were inhabitants of Pratishthana, the Rashtrikas ruled as Maharathis, while the Bhojas held Vidarbha. This region was ruled by vassals of Mauryan Kingdom (Satvahan ancestors - regional chieftain of Mauryan Empire).

=== Satavahana Dynasty (207 BCE–199 CE) ===
Just 50 years after king Ashoka's death, Satavahanas came into prominence in Western Maharashtra. Its founder was Simuka. Just after Simuka ended his rule, his brother Krishna took control of the throne. It was during reign of Krishna that Nashik region was included in the Satavahana Empire. Krishna left an inscription in the cave which he excavated for Buddhist monks near nashik. The next ruler of the dynasty was Satakarni I. After his death, his wife, Nayanika/Naganika Satakarni, took control of the throne on behalf her sons, Vedishri and Shaktishri. Naneghat inscription describes Vedishri as a very brave king, who was a unique warrior on the earth and was the lord of Dakshinapatha (Deccan). Many years after the vedishree reign, most of Satavahana territories like Malwa, Nashik, Kathiawar of maharashtra were conquered by Shaka Kshatrapas. Nahapana, a Shaka Kshatrapa probably appointed by the contemporary Kushana Emperor, was ruling over Konkan, Poona, Nasik and some other districts of Maharashtra as well as some portion of Central India as far north as Ajmer .

It was Nahapana who excavated pandav-leni. Several inscriptions of his son-in-law Ushavadata (Sanskrit, Rishabhadatta) have been incised in the Pandu-lena caves near Nasik. Ushavadata was the son of Dinika and had married Dakshamitra, the daughter of Nahapana. These records in the Nasik caves describe the charities and conquests of Ushavadata, who was evidently governing Northern Maharashtra and Konkan on behalf of his father-in-law. He got a cave excavated in the Trirashmi hill near Nasik and assigned it to the Buddhist monks. Later Gautamiputra Satakarni defeated Nahapana of shaka dynasty and regained the satavahana honour. He made a daring dash into Vidarbha and occupied Benakata (or the Wainganga district). Thereafter, he invaded Western Maharashtra and defeated Nahapana somewhere in the Nasik district. The Shaka king accepted Satavahana vassalage, which is shown by his inscription in one of the Nasik caves, wherein he is called Benakatakasvami or the lord of Benakata (Wainganga district). According to the inscription, the king's mother, Gautami Balsari, writes about her son as follows: '...who crushed the pride and conceit of the Kshatrapas. who destroyed the Shakas [Western Kshatrapas], Yavanas [Indo-Greeks] and Pahlavas [Indo-Parthians] who rooted out the Khakharata family [the Kshatrapas of Nahapana] After defeating Nahapana, Gautamiputra called back his silver coins and restruck them. The hoard discovered at Jogal Tembhi in the Nasik district contained more than 10,000 silver coins so restruck.

After Gautamiputra Satakarni most noteworthy successor was Yajnashri Satakari, who conquered all Maharashtra. This can be seen in inscriptions and coins that have been found over a large area. They show that he ruled over a large kingdom extending from Konkan in the west to Andhra desha in the east. He issued among other types the ship-type lead coins indicative of his rule on the maritime province of the Coromandel coast. Within fifty years after Yajnashri Satakarni the rule of the Satavahanas came to an end. By the mid-3rd century the Satavahana King dom fragmented into various parts, each having ruler who claims to be Satavahana descendent. The Satavahanas were liberal patrons of learning and religion. The early kings of the family performed Vedic sacrifices and lavished gifts on the Brahmanas. Krishna, Gautamiputra, Pulumavi and Yajnashri excavated caves and donated villages to provide for the maintenance, clothing and medicines of the Buddhist monks. During this period Nashik was very prosperous . It laid on trade route from Tagara and Pratishthana to Broach and was an important trading centre. The Nashik silk was so famous that so many European historian believe that the stylo of silk and gold brocade that Marco Polo (1290) found being woven at Baghdad and called nasich and nac originally came from Nashik. These silks were known in Europe in the 14th century as nac, nacquts, nachis, naciz, and nasis.

=== Abhira Dynasty (220–377 CE) ===
After fall of Satavahana empire, Abhira dynasty came into prominence, the Abhiras ruled in the north east and the Chutus in Maharashtra and Kuntala. The Puranas state that ten Abhiras ruled for, 67 years. The Nashik inscription peaks of king Madhuriputra Ishvarasena, the Abhir and a son of Shivadatla. This dynasty originated in A. D. 249–50, an era called Kalachuri or Chedi in later times. During this time Nashik was called as Triashmi by some Sanskrit poets of Tribes. The founder of the Abhira dynasty was Rajan Ishvarasena, the son of Shivadatta, who has left an inscription in cave IX at Nasik. It records the investment of hundreds of Karshapanas in certain guilds at Nasik for providing medicines for the sick among the Buddhist mendicants residing in the Viharas of Trirashmi. Ishvarasena started an era commencing in 250 CE, which later became known as the Kalachuri-Chedi era. The earlier dates of this era come from Northern Maharashtra, Gujarat, Central India and Vidarbha. Judging by the expansion of this era, Ishvarasena and his descendants seem to have ruled a large territory comprising Gujarat, Konkan and Northern Maharashtra. Ishvarasena was followed by nine other kings of the family. They state that they ruled for 167 years.

=== Traikutakas (490 CE) ===
The Traikutakas took their family name from the mountain Trikuta which borders the Nasik district on the west. The names of three Traikutaka kings, viz., Indradatta, Dahrasena and Vyaghrasena have become known from their inscriptions and coins found in the Nasik district and Gujarat. Dahrasena performed an Ashvamedha and was, therefore, an independent king. A copper-plate grant discovered at Pardi in the Surat district records the donation, by Dahrasena, of the village Kaniyas-Tadakasarika in the Antarmandali vishaya to a Brahmana residing at Kapura. Dahrasena was succeeded by his son Vyaghrasena who had to acknowledge the supremacy of the Vakataka king Harishena. His copper-plate grant, dated in the year 241 (490 CE) of the Abhira era was discovered at Surat and records the donation of the village Purohita-palIika.

=== Vishnukundins ===
After the downfall of the Vakatakas in the beginning of the 6th century CE, Vidarbha was occupied for some time by the Vishnukundin king Madhavavarman I. He married a Vakataka princess who was probably a daughter or some other near relative of the last known Vakataka Emperor Harishena. He took advantage of the opportunity afforded by the downfall of the Vakatakas and extended his dominion far and Wide. He performed several Vedic sacrifices including eleven Ashvamedhas. That he had brought even Western Maharashtra under his rule is shown by his copper-plate grant discovered at Khanapur in the Satara district. His grandson Madhavavarman II describes himself as the lord of Trikuta and Malaya. So he may have ruled in Western Maharashtra for some time.

=== Kalachuris (550–573 CE) ===
The Vishnukundins were, however, ousted from Maharashtra and Vidarbha by the Kalachuri king Krishnaraja, who rose to power in about 550 CE. He ruled from Mahishmati, modern Maheshvara, in the former Indore State. His coins have been found over a wide territory extending from Rajputana in the north to Maharashtra in the south in the village Devlana in the Baglan taluka of the Nasik district. The hoard comprised 82 coins. The coins were known as Krishnarajarupakas and have been mentioned in the Anjaneri plates dated in the year 461 of the Abhira era (corresponding to 710-711 CE). They were therefore in circulation for at least 150 years after the time of Krishnaraja. Krishnaraja was succeeded by his son Shankaragana, whose copper plate, grant has been discovered at Abhona in the Nasik District. It is dated in the year 347 of the Abhira era, corresponding to 597 CE. The grant shows that Shankaragana was, like his father, ruling over an extensive kingdom stretching from Malva in the north to at least the Nasik and Aurangabad districts in the south. Shankaragana was succeeded by his son Buddharaja, who was involved in a struggle with the Chalukya king Mangalesha on the southern frontier of his kingdom soon after his accession.

=== Chalukyas of Badami (543–754 CE) ===
The Chalukyas of Badami rose to power in the first half of the 6th century CE. The Badami stone inscription of Pulakeshin I, who is the first independent ruler of this dynasty, is dated in 543 CE. He performed the Ashvamedha and several other Shrauta sacrifices. He was succeeded by his son Kirtivarman I, who made some conquests in South India and is described as the night of destruction to the Nalas (of the Bastar district), the Mauryas of Konkan and the Kadambas of Vanavasi (in North Kanara). When Kirtivarman died, his younger brother Mangalesha succeeded him. Mangalesha's reign ended in disaster and he lost his life in a civil war with his nephew Pulakeshin II. The capital of Pulakesin II in the beginning of his reign was Badami in the Bijapur district. The Chinese pilgrim Hiuen Tsang calls him the lord of Maharashtra. This shows that he must have visited him somewhere in Maharashtra. Several identifications of his capital have been proposed by scholars from the description of it given by the Chinese pilgrim, but the most likely view seems to be that of Fleet and Burgess, who identify it with Nasik. Pulakeshin's grant dated in the Shaka year 552 (630 CE) was found at Lohaner in the Baglana taluka of the Nasik district. It is dated in the Shaka year 552 (630 CE) and records Pulakeshin's grant of the village Goviyanaka to a Brahmana residing at Lohanagara (modern Lohaner).

Pulakeshin was killed in battle at Badami in circa 642 CE by the Pallava king Narasimhavarman, who conquered Vatapi and assumed the title of Vatapi-konda (the conqueror of Vatapi). Pulakeshin II was succeeded by his son Vikramaditya I (655-681 CE), after a long continued struggle. He appointed his younger brother Dharashraya Jayasimha to govern South Gujarat, North Konkan and the Nasik district. Jayasimha's Nasik plates are dated in the Abhira year 436 (685 CE) and record his grant of the village Dhondhaka on the occasion of the Vishuva or vernal equinox. Dhondhaka is identical with Dhondegaon, 12 miles north by west of Nasik. From two land-grants recently discovered at Anjaneri, a village near Trimbak in the Nasik district, we have come to know of a feudatory family which ruled over Northern Konkan and the Nasik district in the 7th and 8th centuries CE. This family claimed descent from Harishchandra, the famous legendary king of the Solar race. Svamichandra, who rose to power in the reign of Vikramaditya I, was the founder of this family, and flourished in circa 660 CE. Three generations of this family are known from the two sets of Anjaneri plates-Svamichandra, his son Simhavarman and the latter's son Bhogashakti alias Prithivichandra, who made the two grants. One of them is dated in the year 461 of the Abhira era, corresponding to 710-711 CE. It records the grant of eight villages and certain rites, dues and taxes in favour of the god Narayana, who was named Bhogeshvara evidently after king Bhogashakti, and was installed in a temple at Jayapura, modern Jarwar Budrukh near Anjaneri. The second set of Anjaneri plates tells us that Bhogashakti granted certain rights, privileges and exemptions to the merchants of Samagiripattana when he resettled the town and the neighbouring villages some time after their devastation. Bhogashakti's successor was probably overthrown by the Rashtrakuta king Dantidurga, who, from his Ellora plates, is known to have occupied the Nasik district some time before 715 CE. Kirtivarman, the last of the Early Chalukyas, was defeated by Dantidurga some time before 754 CE, when lie issued his Samangad plates. Kirtivarman continued to rule for a few years more, but he had lost the paramount position in the Deccan.

=== Rashtrakuta Dynasty (754–950 CE) ===
The Rashtrakutas who succeeded the Chalukya in the Deccan originally hailed from Lattalura. When they rose to power they were probably residing in the Aurangabad district, where their earlier records have been found. Dantidurga was the real founder of the Rashtrakuta imperial power. Dantidurga made extensive conquests. Dantidurga was succeeded by his uncle Krishna I. who completed the conquests and shattered the power of the Early Chalukyas completely. Krishna I was not only a great conqueror but also a great builder. The Rashtrakuta family produced several great conquerors who boldly invaded North and South India and achieved memorable victories such as Druva, Govinda II . Several copper-plate grants of Govinda III have been found in the Vidarbha and Marathwada Divisions of Maharashtra. It is not possible to give a description of all of them, but we may refer to that discovered in the Nasik district. A set of plates was discovered at Wani in the Dindori taluka of the Nasik district. It was issued by Govinda III and is dated in the Shaka year 730 (808 CE) and records the grant of Ambakagram in the Vatanagara vishaya in the Nasikadesha to Brahmana Damodarabhatta, an inhabitant of Vengi, who belonged to the community of the Chaturvedins of that place. Govinda III was succeeded by his son Amoghavarsha I, who was a man of peaceful disposition, but whose reign was full of troubles. In later years, the Rashtrakuta feudatories, who rose in rebellion against Govinda IV, deposed him and placed his uncle Baddiga-Amogha varsha III on the throne. The latter was a man of quiet nature and spiritual temperament, who left the administration of the kingdom entirely to his ambitious and able son Krishna III. Like some of his illustrious ancestors, Krishna III also led an expedition in North India and captured the forts of Kalanjara and Chitrakuta. He succeeded his father in 939 CE.

=== Chalukyas (? – 1157 CE) ===
The Rashtrakuta power became weak after the death of Krishna III. Within six years his large empire crumbled to pieces like a house of cards. Tailap II, the founder of the Later Chalukya dynasty, who was a Mahasamanta of the Rashtrakutas, suddenly came into prominence. The Paramara king Vakpati Munja planned to invade the Chalukya dominion but his wise minister Rudraditya advised him not to cross the Godavari, which was the boundary between the Chalukya and Paramara dominions. Munja did not heed his advice and was taken prisoner by Tailapa. He was placed in a prison where he was waited upon by Tailapa's sister Mrinalavati. He fell in love with her and foolishly disclosed to her the plan of his escape. She communicated it to Tailapa, who is said to have made him beg from door to door and then beheaded him. The most famous of the noteworthy successors after Talipa II was Vikramaditya VI, the founder of the Chalukya-Vikrama Samvat. He ascended the throne in 1075 CE. Tailap III, the last Chalukya king, was overthrown by the Kalachuri Bijjala, who was his Commander-in-Chief, in 1157 CE.

=== Yadavas (? – 1318 CE) ===
In the last quarter of the 12th century CE, the Yadavas of Devagiri came into prominence. They had previously been ruling over Seunadesha (Khandesh) as feudatories of the Chalukyas of Kalyani. The founder of the family was Dridhaprahara, the son of Subahu. His capital was Shrinagara as stated in the Vratakhanda, while from an early inscription it appears to have been Chandradityapura, which is identified with the modern Chandor in the Nasik district. His son and successor was Seunachandra, from whom the country ruled over by him came to be known as Seunadesha. This corresponds to modern Khandesh. It comprised the country extending from Nasik to Devagiri. King Seunachandra established city called Seunpur/Sindiner (Sinnar). From a stone inscription found at Anjaneri near Nasik, it appears that there was a minor branch of the Yadava family ruling at Anjaneri. Seunadeva of this branch made some grant to a Jain temple. Seunadeva calls himself Mahasamanta and evidently was dependent on the main branch. This family ruled over a small district of which Anjaneri was the chief city. There were many noteworthy rulers in the Yadava dynasty. In 1294 CE Alauddin Khalji invaded the kingdom of Ramachandra and suddenly appeared before the gates of Devagiri. Ramachandra was unaware and could not hold out long. He had to pay a heavy ransom to the Muslim conqueror. He continued, however, to rule till 1310 CE at least; for the aforementioned Purushottampuri plates are dated in that year. He was succeeded by his son Shankaragana some time in 1311 CE. He discontinued sending the stipulated tribute to Delhi. He was then defeated and slain by Malik Kafur. Some time thereafter, Harapaladeva, the son-in-law of Ramachandra, raised an insurrection and drove away the Muhammedans, but his success was short-lived. The Hindu kingdom of Devagiri, thus came to an end in 1318 CE. During their rule a peculiar style of architecture called Hemadpanti after Hemadri or Hemadpant, a minister of Mahadeva and Ramachandra came into vogue. Temples built in this style are found in all the districts of Maharashtra. Marathi literature also flourished in the age of the Yadavas. Chakradhara, who propagated the Mahanubhava cult in that age, used Marathi as the medium of his religious teaching. Following his example, several of his followers composed literary works in Marathi.

=== Maratha period ===
Nashik area was under the control of Mughals until Aurangzeb’s death (i.e. 1707 CE).

- After 1707 CE, Nashik area fully came under Maratha kingdom.
- Chieftain Naroshankar Raje Bahadar built Rameshwara temple and hung the Naroshankar bell there.
- Kapaleshwara temple was built in 1738.
- Chieftain Chandrachud built Sundar Narayana temple in 1756.
- Chieftain Aadekar rebuilt Kalaram temple in 1790.
- Nijam Ul Mulk Asaf Jahan died in 1748 and his son Nasir Jung became king. After Bajirao's death, his elder son Nanasaheb became the new Peshava. But in this new kingdom era also, Nizam and Maratha conflicts were continued. Nasir Jung got murdered in 1751 and Nizam's third son took the authority. He attacked Marathas from Aurangabad with the help of French people. But Marathas and Nizam's third son were agreed on peace talks and battle got cancelled in 1752. According to these peace talks Marathas received all Khandesh area between Godavari and Tapi river under their rule. In 1751, after Nizam's death, Marathas started using the name Nashik for the city. As it was called Gulshanabad in Nizam's rule. In 1760–61, after Salabat Jung’s defeat, Nashik was an important city for Peshavas.
- In 1761, Madhavrao became new Peshava, after Nanasaheb’s death.
- 1763 – Vinayak Rao abandoned Nashik, Junnar and Sangamner cities. Peshavas appointed Balaji Sakharam as governor of a Bagal province.
- Peshava's were ruling this area till 1818. Thomas Hyslow and British army conquered Kopargaon and north side of Chandwad in 1818.
- They conquered Thalner from Khandesh area, Chandwad fort on 7 March 1818. At the end of March 1818, British army conquered total Nashik area in battle with Holkars.

=== British period ===
The British conquered the Maratha kingdom and declared Nashik as an important city as a Division. People from Bhilla community started protest against British government. Almost 7000 people from south Nashik and north Ahemadnagar contributed in the protest march. Magoji Naik was the main leader in the march; he reunited all the tribal people. British army sent Lieutenants Henry T. Thatcher and L. Tailor to deal with the Bhilla people. Before attacking Bhillas, governor of Sangamner and Sinnar area asked Magoji Naik to surrender, but he refused. Bhogoji Naik was another important leader from the Bhilla people. After a tough battle British army could gain the control back in hand over Nashik area. Then there was a peace until 1860.

- 1860 - Nashik received a rank of separate district.
- 1861 - British started Anglo-vernacular school
- 1864 - Nashik city received a Nagar Parishad status. First newspaper in Nashik area started in this period which was called as Nashik News.
- 1877 - Gopal Hari Deshmukh and Nyayamurthi Mahadev Ranade entered in social life of Nashik city.
- 1889 - Nasik Tram was started from Old Municipal Building on main road to Nasik Road railway station. Tram served people of Nasik for almost 44 years.
- 1899 - Veer Vinayak Sawarkar whose birthplace is Bhagur in Nashik secretly started Rashtrabhakta organization. ‘Mitramela’ group also gave fame to Nashik.
- Veer Sawarkar visited London and stayed there. He administered Mitramela group from London.
- Lokmanya Tilak conducted a protest march against British government in Nashik, on 31 May 1907.
- Hutatma Anant Kanhere took part in Mitramela group and in its social work.
- Anant Kanhere shot dead Mr Jackson, a cruel collector of Nashik, on 21 December 1909.
- Krishna Gopal Karve, Narayan Joshi, Ganesh Joshi were got interrogated in Mr Jackson's murder case.
- British government hanged Mr. Kanhere, Karve and Deshpande for Mr. Jakson's murder.
- British army arrested Veer Sawarkar and kept in prison.
- Dr. Babasaheb Ambedkar also contributed in Nashik's development.
- Dr. Ambedkar fought for rights of untouched people and gave them right to enter Hindu temples. This is called as Kalaram Satyagraha. British people conquered all Maratha kingdom and declared Nashik as an important city as a Division

Some of the major events in history of Nashik in last three centuries were:

- 1615: The city was captured by Moguls (Kaustubh Shimpi) from Nizamshah Sultan and name changed to "Gulshanabad".
- 1634: The city was recaptured by Shahaji Raje for his new state of Nizamshah headquartered in Premgiri (near Sangamner).
- 1636: Shahaji Raje made pact with Mogul. Nashik again moved to Mogul rule.
- 1663: Netaji Palkar recovered Chauthai from Nashik for Shivaji of Pune.
- 1673: Jadhavrao and Siddi Halal left job of Mogul and joined army of Shivaji on Triambak Fort, thus Nashik became part of Maratha rule.
- 1685: Aurangzeb Captured Nashik City during Sambhaji's rule.
- 1685: City back again in Maratha kingdom under Sambhaji's rule
- 1695: City was raided by Santaji followed by temporary Maratha rule.
- 1719: Officially Shahu got right to collect Chauthai of City from Mughals of Delhi.
- 1725: The city frequently camped by Marathas who heading to Malwa, Gujrat for campaigns.
- 1734: The city name was restored to Nashik.
- 1862: Nashik Road Railway Station was built.
- 1864: Nashik Municipality formed.
- 1869: Nashik district formed.

Nashik also participated in the freedom struggle of India. On 21 December 1909, 17-year-old Anant Kanhere shot the Collector of Nashik, Jackson in a theatre named Vijayanand theatre, where he had gone to see a play Sharada. Jackson died on the spot. The people involved in the incident, Anant Laxman Kanhere, Krishnaji Gopal Karve and Vinayak Ramchandra Deshpande were sentenced to death by hanging and were hanged soon after.

In 1930, the Nashik Satyagraha was launched under the leadership of Dr. Babasaheb Ambedkar for the entry of Dalits in Kalaram Mandir (Temple). In 1931, a meeting of the Bombay Province Charmkar Parishad was organised in Nashik to work out the Chambhars' position with regard to the Second Round Table Conference in which Babasaheb was going to participate. In 1932, Babasaheb organized his temple entry movement for the abolition of untouchability in Nashik.

There is a confusion whether it is pronounced Nasik or Nashik. Before 1982 both the city and district were called by the name Nasik. On 7 November 1982, the population of Nasik City exceeded to 1.2 million, so as per incorporation rules, Nasik City became a Corporation. Since then the city name has changed to Nashik City.
