= Abhira kingdom =

Ancient Indian polity

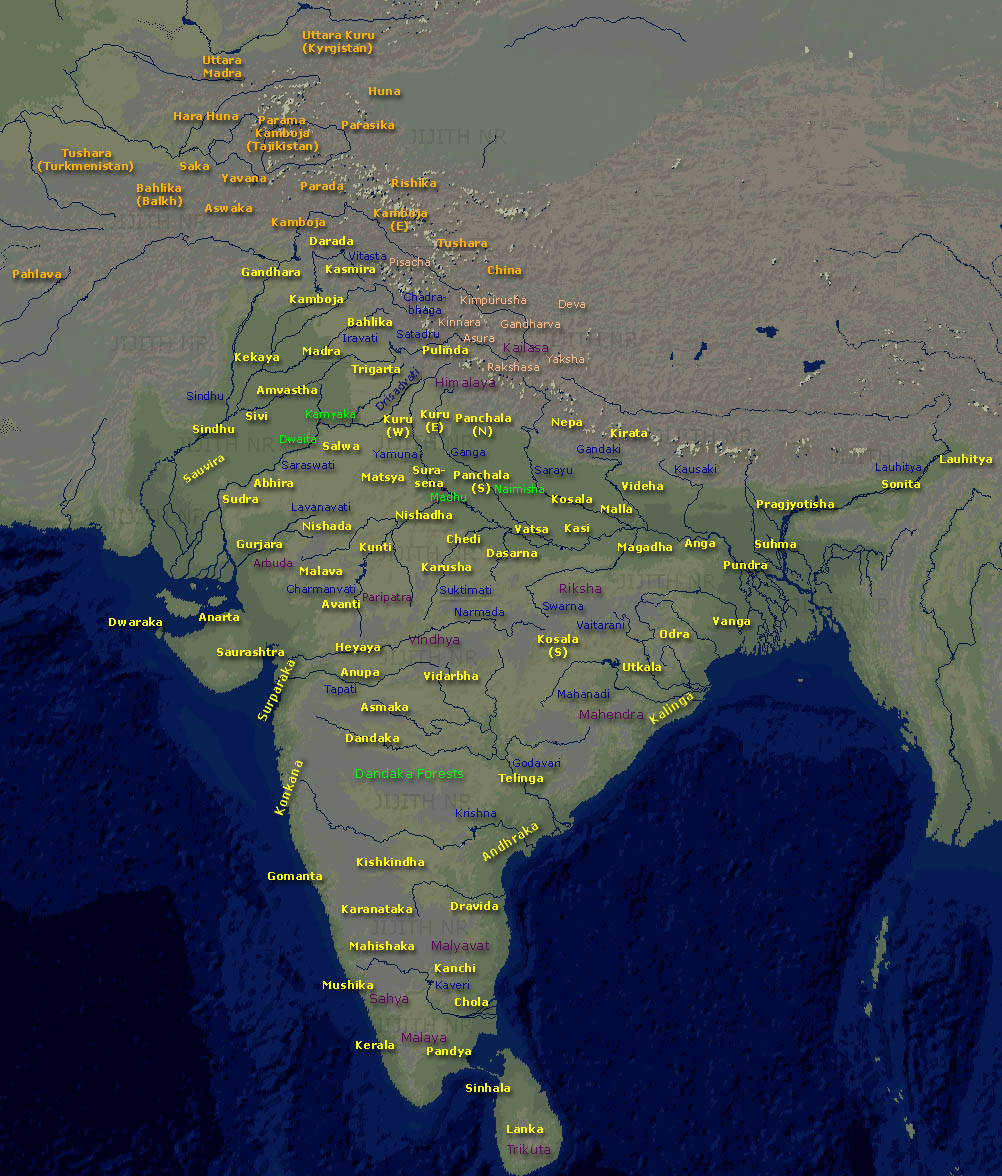
- Religion: Bhagavata
- Government: Monarchy
- Historical era: Early Mahajanapada (Mahabharata)
- Today part of: Pakistan; India

The Abhira kingdom in the Mahabharata is either of two kingdoms near the Sarasvati river. It was dominated by the Abhiras, sometimes referred to as Surabhira

== Mahabharata ==
The Sabha-parva and Bhisma-parva sections of the Mahabharata mention the province of Abhira, situated near what once was the Sarasvati River in ancient Sind. and the place they inhabited was known as Abhiradesa. Later, for a period of time, they were ruled by Maharaja Yudhisthira. they are prophesied by the sage Markandeya to rule in the Kaliyuga. Vātsyāyana also mentions the Abhira kingdoms in the Kama Sutra. References of Abhira being residents of kingdom ruled by Yudhisthira is found in Bhagwatam. Their king Chitra, was killed by Prativindhya, the son of Yudhishthira and Draupadi. They defeated the hero of Mahabharatha war, sparing him when he disclosed the identity of the members of the family of Sri Krishna. Arjuna had killed all Kauravas and was defeated by Gopas (Abhiras) was only Hari's play.

== Abhira kingdom of Mathura ==
In the south was Mathura, the powerful kingdom of the fearless cow-herding Abhira tribe ruled by King Ugrasena, the maternal grandfather of Krishna.

== Abhira kingdom of Maharashtra ==
The Abhiras established a large kingdom in Maharashtra, succeeding the Satavahanas, which included Nasik, Aparanta, Lata, Khandesh and Vidarbha.

== Abhira kingdom of Saurashtra ==
The Abhiras began to rule in Southern and western Saurashtra from the second half of the 10th century A.D. Their capital was Vamanshtali, modern Vanthali nine miles west of Junagadh. They became very powerful during the reign of Graharipu who defeated the Saindhavas and the Chaulukyas.

== See also ==
- Abiria
- Abhira dynasty
- Abhira people
- Mahajanapadas
- Yadava–Abhira Wars
