= Indian Institute for Research in Numismatic Studies =

Indian Institute of Research in Numismatic Studies
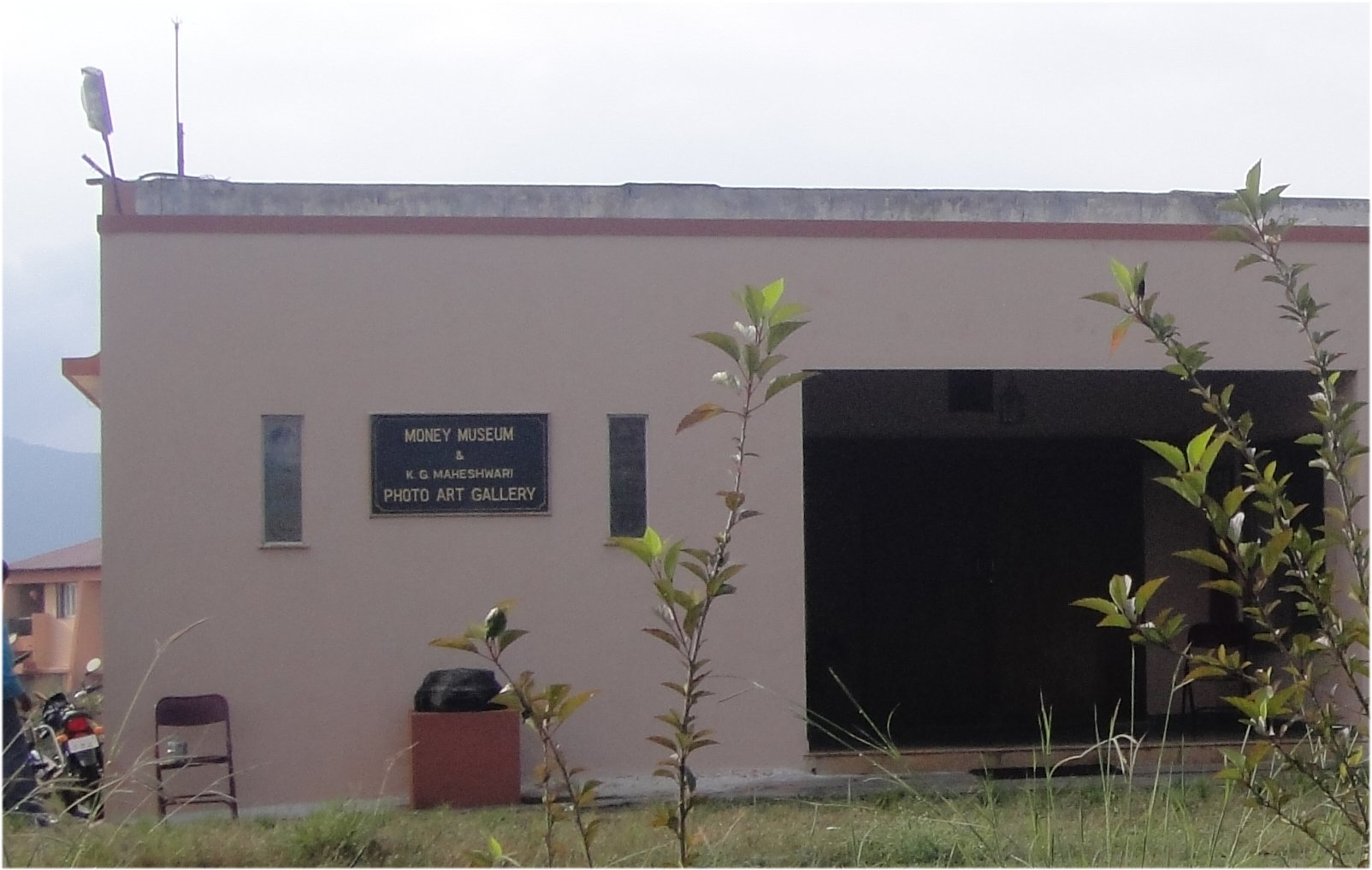
- Entrance to the Museum Wing
- Established: 1980
- Location: Anjaneri, near Nasik, Maharashtra.
- Coordinates: 19.957703°N 73.610941°E
- Type: Numismatic
- Director: Amiteshwar Jha
- Curator: Amiteshwar Jha
- Website: inhcrf.org

Indian Institute of Research in Numismatic Studies is located near the town of Nasik in Maharashtra state of India. Known locally as the Coin Museum or Money Museum, it is primarily a research centre with one wing dedicated to a public gallery.

== Description ==
The Institute was founded in 1980 with the efforts of numismatist Parmeshwari Lal Gupta and industrialist K. K. Maheshwari. It moved to its current location at Anjaneri near Nasik in 1984. It is operated by Indian Numismatic Historical and Cultural Research Foundation (INHCRF), a registered Trust under Maharashtra government. The Trust also operates Indian Rock Art Research Centre, established in 2005.

The aims of the Institute are to promote study and research in numismatics, by supporting scholars and university researchers and providing training to them. The Institute also houses a museum and a library.

== Facilities ==
They have trained researchers who have specialized on different numismatic periods, such as ancient, early medieval, medieval and late medieval. They offer services (free of cost) to any enquiry, made through the mail or otherwise, on academic aspect of any coin or coin series found in India. They also have a well equipped library having a good collection of numismatic and allied books.

=== Museum and library ===
The gallery has two displays. The first is a small display on the money of India drawn from the collection of the institute. The second is a display of the photographic work of K G Maheshwari.

The IIRNS boasts the most significant numismatic library in India, catering to scholars and providing guest house accommodations. This extensive collection encompasses both Indian and non-Indian numismatic literature, along with slides, file cards, and various records of numismatic collections. Additionally, the library houses photo indexes of coins, organized by series, totaling around 1,50,000 items.

Any scholar or interested individual is warmly invited to visit and utilize the facilities. The Institute offers a Scholars’ Residence equipped with modern amenities, available to anyone eager to conduct coin-related research or studies at a nominal fee within their campus.

== Publications ==
The institute publishes books and journals on a variety of subjects but primarily in numismatics. It publishes the Numismatic Digest, an annual publication. It also publishes proceedings international colloquia (conducted in 1987, 1991 and 2001). Sample publications of the Institute include:

- K. K. Maheshwari and K. W. Wiggins, Maratha Mints and Coinage (1989).
- Amiteshwar Jha and Sanjay Garg, A Catalogue of the Coins of the Katoch Rulers of Kangra (1991).
- Amiteshwar Jha and Dilip Rajgor, Studies in the Coinages of the Western Ksatrapas (1994).
- Paul Murphy, Kosala State Region, c. 600–470 BC: Silver Punchmarked Coinages
