= Abhira dynasty =

Third-century dynasty in India

- 203–315 or 370
- The Abhiras and main South Asian polities circa 350 CE.
- Capital: Anjaneri, Thalner, Prakashe, Bhamer, Asirgarh
- Common languages: Apabhraṃśa, Sanskrit, Prakrit
- Religion: Hinduism; Buddhism; Jainism
- Government: Monarchy
- Historical era: Early Classical
  - Established: 203
  - Supplanted by the Traikutakas: 315 or 370
Preceded by
Satavahanas
Kshatrapas
Ikshvakus of Vijayapuri
Succeeded by
Traikutakas
Vakatakas
Kshatrapas
Kadambas
- Today part of: India

The Abhira dynasty was a dynasty that ruled over the western Deccan, where it perhaps succeeded the Satavahana dynasty. From 203 to roughly 270 or 370, this dynasty formed a vast kingdom. The Abhiras had an extensive empire comprising modern-day Maharashtra, Konkan, Gujarat and parts of southern Madhya Pradesh. Some scholars regard the Abhiras as a great almost an imperial power in the third century A.D.

== Origin ==
Though often referenced in ancient Indian literature, the origin of the Abhiras is obscure. According to the Mahabharata, the Abhiras lived near the seashore and on the bank of the Sarasvati, a river near Somnath in Gujarat. The Mahābhashya of Patañjali simply mentions them as a tribe distinct from the Shudras. The Puranic texts associate the Abhiras with Saurashtra and Avanti. According to Balkrishna Gokhale, the Abhiras have been well-known since epic times as a martial tribe. The Bhagavata calls the Abhiras, "Saurashtra" and "Avantya" rulers (Saurashtra-Āvanty Ābhīrāḥ), and the Vishnu treats the Abhiras as occupying the Surashtra and Avanti provinces.

The Puranas claim that the imperial Abhiras were the successors of the Satavahanas. They were called Andhra-Vratyas and mentioned as the successors of the line of Simuka. Some of them entered the military service of the Western Satraps (Sakas), and helped them in conquest of new territories. By 181 A.D, the Abhiras had gained considerable influence at the Kshatrapa court. Some of them were even serving as generals.

The Gunda inscription dated Saka year 103 (181 CE) refers to Abhira Rudrabhuti as the senapati (commander-in-chief) of the Saka satrap (ruler) Rudrasimha. The inscription also gives a detailed genealogy of the kings up to Rudrasimha:

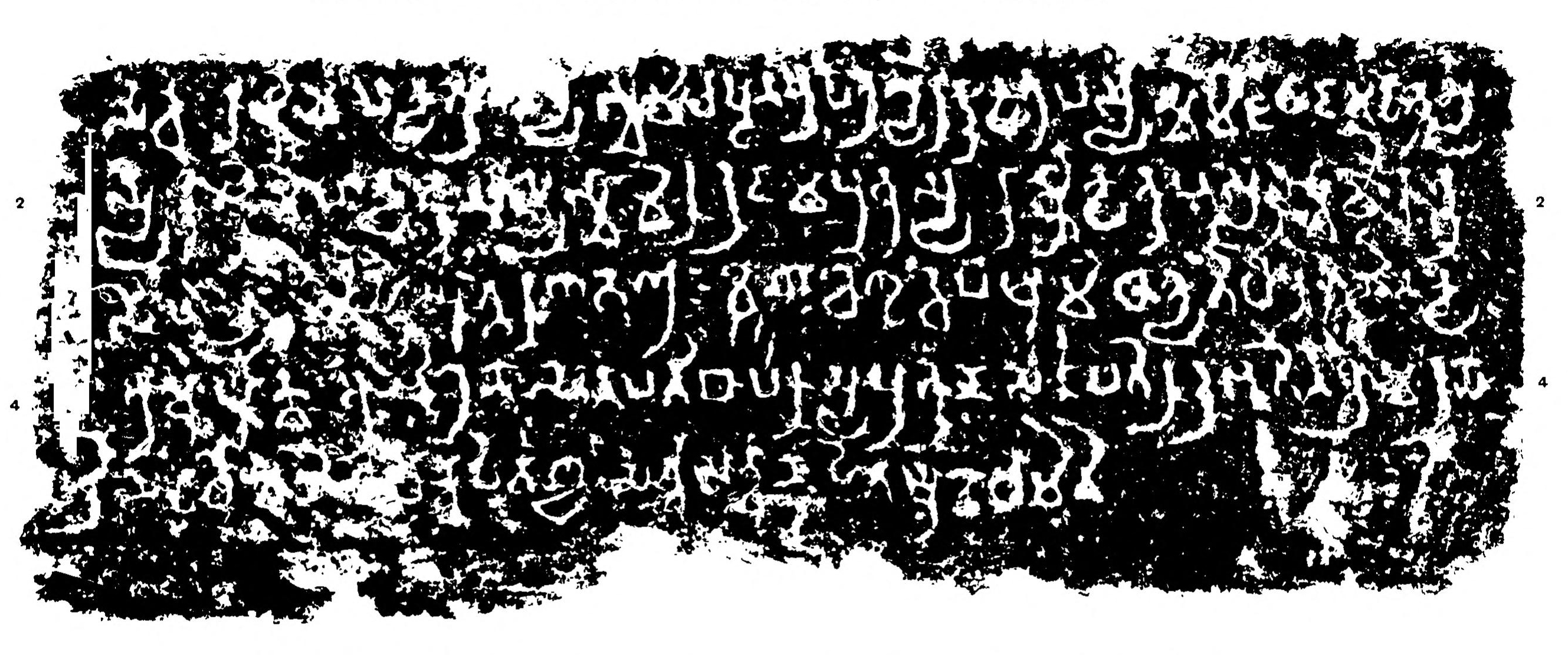
Gunda inscription of Rudrasimha, Saka year 103.

"Hail ! On the [auspicious] fifth tithi of the bright fortnight of Vaisakha during the auspicious period of the constellation of Rohini, in the year one hundred and three — 100 3 — (during the reign) of the king, the Kshatrapa Lord Rudrasiha (Rudrasimha), the son of the king, the Maha-Kshatrapa Lord Rudradaman (and) son’s son of the king, the Kshatrapa Lord Jayadaman, (and) grandson's son of the king, the Maha-Kshatrapa Lord Chashtana, the well was caused to be dug and embanked by the general (senapati) Rudrabuthi, the son of the general (senapati) Bapaka, the Abhira, at the village (grama) of Rasopadra, for the welfare and comfort of all living beings."

— Epigraphia Indica XVI, p. 233

The inscription refers to Rudrasimha as simply a ksatrapa, ignoring the existence of any mahaksatrapa. According to Sudhakar Chattopadhyaya, this indicates that the Abhira general was the de facto ruler of the state, though not assuming any higher title. The inscription states Abhira Rudrabhuti as the son of the general Bapaka. The Abhira dynasty was probably related Abhira Rudrabhuti.

According to Prof Bhagwan Singh Suryavanshi, the Abhiras settled in southwestern Rajasthan and northeastern Sindh in the first century B.C. This region was called Abiria. Archaeologist and scholar Bhagwan Lal Indraji (1839–1888) believed that the Abhiras probably came by sea from Sindh, conquered the western coast, and made Trikuta in Aparanta their capital. Abhira Mahakshtrapa Isvaradatta was their leader. He probably attacked and gained a victory over the Kshatrapas. Indarji further states that the Abhira Mahakshtrapa Isvaradatta was the founder of the Traikutaka dynasty – known later as the Kalachuri or the Chedi era{snd}}originating probably in the establishment of his power in the Konkan, with Traikuta as his capital. Under Rudrasena, son of Viradaman the Kṣhatrapas, the Western Satraps appear to have re-established their sovereignty by driving out the Traikutakas who, thus dispossessed, retired to Central India and assumed the name of Haihaya or Kalachuri. On the final destruction of the Kshatrapa rule, the Traikutakas apparently regained Traikutaka about which time Dharasena (A.D. 456) succeeded to the throne.

== History ==
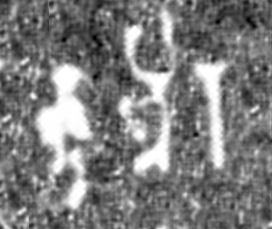
"Ābhīra" in later Brahmi script in the Allahabad Pillar inscription of Samudragupta.

The history of the Abhiras is shrouded in much obscurity. The Abhira dynasty was founded by Ishwarsena. The branch came to power after the demise of the Satavahanas in the Nasik region of Maharashtra, with the help and consent of the Western Satraps (Sakas). They were known as Gavali rajas indicating that they were cowherds by profession before becoming kings. Ten Abhira kings ruled in the Maharashtra region of the Deccan, whose names have not been mentioned in the Puranas. An Abhira king is known to have sent an embassy to the Sassanid Shahanshah of Persia, Narseh, to congratulate him on his victory against Bahram III.

During the time of the Gupta Empire, the Indian emperor Samudragupta recorded Abhira as a "frontier kingdom" which paid an annual tribute. This was recorded by Samudragupta's Allahabad Pillar inscription, which states the following in lines 22–23.

"Samudragupta, whose formidable rule was propitiated with the payment of all tributes, execution of orders and visits (to his court) for obeisance by such frontier rulers as those of Samataṭa, Ḍavāka, Kāmarūpa, Nēpāla, and Kartṛipura, and, by the Mālavas, Ārjunāyanas, Yaudhēyas, Mādrakas, Ābhīras, Prārjunas, Sanakānīkas, Kākas, Kharaparikas and other nations."

— Lines 22–23 of the Allahabad pillar inscription of Samudragupta (r. c. 350–375 CE– ).

The duration of the Abhira rule is uncertain, with most of the Puranas giving it as sixty-seven years, while the Vayu Purana gives it as one hundred and sixty-seven years. According to V.V Mirashi, the following were the feudatories of the Abhiras:

- The Maharajas of Valkha
- Isvararata
- The kings of Mahishmati
- The Traikutakas

The Abhiras spoke Apabhraṃśa, and seem to have patronised Sanskrit. The Nasik cave inscription of Isvarsena is written mostly in Sanskrit. Several guilds flourished in their kingdom, in which people invested large amounts for making endowments. This indicates peace, order and security in the kingdom of the Abhiras.

Patanjali in his Mahabhashya mentioned the Abhira kings. Abhira chieftains served as generals to the Saka rulers. In the second century A.D., an Ahir Chief Isvaradatta became the Mahakshatrapa (Supreme King). The Abhira played a key role in causing downfall of Satvahanas in third century A.D.

=== Saka Satakarni ===
Another king claiming to be a son of Mathari besides Abhira Ishwarsena is Sakasena. He is identified with Saka Satakarni, whose coins have been found over Andhra Pradesh and is taken to be a Satavahana king and successor of Yajna Sri Satakarni. However, K.Gopalchari thinks that Sakasena was an Abhira king. Reasons:

- The name of Sakasena or Saka Satakarni does not occur in the Puranic genealogies of the Satavahana kings. He claimed to be th son of Mathari, the wife of Abhira Sivadatta, as indicated by his epithet Mathariputra.
- The traditional title of Siri which is found on most coins and inscriptions of the Satavahanas is significantly absent in the case of this ruler.
- Considering the dynastic rivalry between the Saka Kshatrapas, the naming of a Satavahana prince with its main content as Saka is very unnatural and unlikely.
- The Abhiras were earlier in the service of the Saka rulers of Ujjaini, and in those days, feudatory chiefs used to name their sons after the names of their overlords. The name of Sakasena was probably a result of this practice. The suffix of Sena in his name also suggests that he was an Abhira king and related to Ishwarsena.

So this concludes that Ishwarsena's predecessor was his elder brother Sakasena, and Ishwarsena ascended the throne after his death.

Sakasena was probably the first great Abhira king. His inscriptions from the Konkan and coins from Andhra Pradesh suggest that he ruled over a large portion of the Satavahana Empire.

=== Abhira Ishwarsena ===
Ishwarsena was the first independent Abhira king. He was the son of Abhira Sivadatta and his wife Mathari. Ashvini Agrawal thinks he was a general in the service of Rudrasimha I who deposed his master in 188 A.D and ascended the throne. Ashvini Agrawal further says that Rudrasimha I soon deposed him and regained the throne in 190 A.D. He (Ishwarsena) started an era which later became known as the Kalachuri-Chedi era. His descendants ruled for nine generations. Ishwarsena's coins are dated only in the first and second years of his reign and are found in Saurashtra and Southern Rajputana.

The Traikuta rule of Aparanta or Konkan begins in A.D. 248 (Traikuta era) exactly the time of Ishwarsena's rule, hence Traikutas are identified with the Abhira dynasty.

The Abhiras began to rule in Southern and western Saurashtra from the second half of the 10th century A.D their capital was vamanshtali, modern vanthali nine miles west of Junagadh. They became very powerful during the reign of Graharipu who defeated the Saindhavas and the Chaulukyas.

== Territory ==
The Abhiras ruled western Maharashtra which included Nasik and its adjoining areas, Aparanta, Lata, Ashmaka, and Khandesh Their core territory included Nasik and the adjoining areas. The Abhira territory also may have consisted of Malwa, which they gradually seized from the Kshatrapas.

== Decline ==
After the death of Abhira Vashishthiputra Vasusena, the Abhiras probably lost their sovereign and paramount status. The Abhiras lost most of their domains to the rising Vakatakas (north) and the Kadambas (south-west). The Abhiras were finally supplanted by their feudatories, the Traikutakas. But still many petty Abhira chieftains and kings continued to rule until the fourth century, roughly till 370 AD, in the Vidarbha and Khandesh region. They continued to rule, but without sovereignty, until they came into conflict with the Kadamba king Mayurasarman and were defeated.

== Descendants ==
According to the historian Yaaminey Mubayi, several such dynasties, like the Kalachuris, Chalukyas, Rashtrakutas and later the Seuna Yadavas trace their origin to Abhiras, which highlights the integration of politically strong pastoral groups into Brahmanical caste order.

== See also ==
- History of Nashik
- Abhira era
- Kalachuris of Tripuri
- Abhira
- Deccan

== Sources ==
- Banerjee, Biswanath (1999). Shudraka. Makers of Indian Literature. New Delhi: Sahitya Academy. ISBN 81-260-0697-8.
