= Kalachuri Era =

Hindu year numbering system

The Kalachuri era also called the Chedi era was a Hindu system of year numbering started by the abhira King Ishwarsena in which the year numbering started at some time from 248 to 250 CE.

== Origin ==
The German scholar F. Kielhorn suggested that the system began in September 248, the year that began with the month of Asvina. It was first used in Gujarat and Maharashtra (particularly Northern Maharashtra), from where it spread to Madhya Pradesh and Uttar Pradesh where it was used until the 13th century CE. Some sources cite an Early Kalachuri era founded in Mahismati through its ruler Maharaja Subandhu who could be an ancestor to the Kalachuris.

== See also ==
- History of Nashik
- Traikutaka dynasty
- Kalachuri dynasty
- Kalachuris of Tripuri
