= Vadner Bhairao =

Vadner
- town
- Location in Maharashtra, India
- Coordinates: 20°15′N 74°02′E
- Country: India
- State: Maharashtra
- District: Nashik

Languages
  - Official: Marathi
- Time zone: UTC+5:30 (IST)
- Nearest city: Pimpalgaon Baswant

Vadner is a town of about 30,000 people in Nashik district, Maharashtra state, India. Vadner is famous for its grapes.

Vadner is 45km to Northeast side from nashik city.The town is predominantly an agrarian one with approximately 80% of its population engaged in agriculture and related activities. The remaining 20% are in supporting activities like services, transport, and retail. Vadner is a fairly rich town due to grape farming.

The predominant religion in Vadner is Hindu, although Islam is also practiced by many families. Most farmer families are Phool-Mali and Maratha. The caste divide is not very strong in day-to-day activities. However, in terms of marriages and political lobbying, caste divides are well entrenched.

Every year in the month of April, a festival takes place on the eve of the marriage of the god Bhairvnath.

Many aspects of modern life remain underdeveloped in Vadner. Internet is available, and banking is carried out by local cooperatives. There is no major hospital and residents must rely on nearly larger towns for nonessential market items.
