= Sarsavani =

- Interactive map of Sarsavani
- Coordinates: 22.905422°N 72.869326°E
- Country: India
- State: Gujarat

Government
  - Type: Grampanchayat
  - Body: Sarsavani Grampanchayat
- Elevation: 37 m (121 ft)

Population
  - Total: 5,000

Languages
  - Official: Gujarati, Hindi
- Time zone: UTC+5:30 (IST)
- PIN: 387430
- Telephone code: 02694
- Vehicle registration: GJ-07
- Nearest city: Ahmedabad
- Lok Sabha constituency: Kheda
- Vidhan Sabha constituency: Mahemdavad
- Website: www.saraswani.com

Sarsavani is a village located in the Mahemdavad Taluka of Kheda district, Gujarat, India.It is located is located 28 km towards East from District headquarters Kheda.

== Demographics ==
It has a population of approximately 5,000 people.

== Geography ==
Sarasavani village is situated on the banks of the Vatrak River. Sarsavani is located within Mahemdavad Taluka in the Kheda District of Gujarat State, India, 28 km east from district headquarters Kheda, 17 km from Mahemdavad, 32 km from Nadiad and 50 km from state capital Gandhinagar.

Nearby villages include Sarasavani Haladarvas (3 km), Satrunda (3 km), Aklacha (3 km), Karoli (3 km), Kothipura (3 km), Bharkunda (4 km), Ghodasar (8 km), Rinchol (9 km), Sihunj (10 km), and Chhipadi (17 km). Sarsavani is surrounded by Kathlal Taluka towards the east, Mahemdavad Taluka and Kheda Taluka towards the west, and Nadiad Taluka towards the south.

Mahemdavad, Nadiad, Kheda, and Kapadvanj are cities near Sarsavani.

Sarsavani Pin code is 387430 and postal head office is Sinhuj .

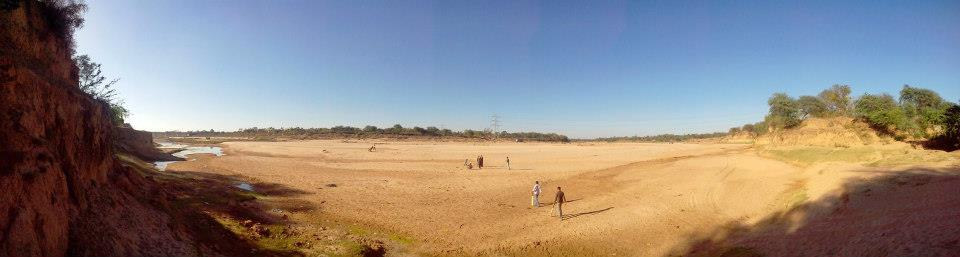
Panorama view of riverbank of Vatrak at Sarsavani

== Weather and climate ==
Summer day temperatures in Sarsavani are between 32 °C and 46 °C.

=== Average temperatures ===
January is 21 °C, February is 23 °C, March is 28 °C, April is 32 °C, May is 36 °C.

== Panchayat information ==
- Sarsavani Panchayat Code: 1113001046
- Sarsavani Village Code: 1113001046001
- The Panchayat Sarsavani the local name and reference number of the government of India (code) is 162,015.
- According to the 2011 census the total population of the village is 5,000; 2,584 men and 2,416 women.
- 17 – Kheda district under a parliamentary constituency of Lok Sabha constituencies district mahemadavada
- 117 – Parliamentary Assembly mahemadavada taluka of Kheda district constituency seats

== Economy ==
Sarsavani's chief occupations are farming, animal husbandry, and farm labour. Crops farmed include corn, millet, cotton, castor, pigeon pea, green bean, watermelon, cantaloupes, bottle gourds, tobacco, potatoes, onions, cotton, garlic, chilies, sorghum, kenaf, finger millet, and foxtail millet. Dairy facilities are also available.

== Amenities ==
The village primary school is in the village center (Panchayat house).

== School and colleges ==
1. Anganvadi
2. Balarka Vidya Vihar Higher Secondary School.
3. Ravishankar Maharaj Primary School.
4. J S Ayurved Maha Vidyalaya -Nadiad.
5. M. D. Shah Commerce & B. D. Patel Arts College- Mahudha
6. Jeevan Shilp Education Trust, M.p. Patel College Of Pharmacy- Kapadwanj
7. Shree Seva Sangh, Pandva Sanchalit, Hari Om Pharmacy College- Ambav; Thasra
8. Kheda Arts and Commerce College- Kheda

== Notable people ==
- Ravi Shankar Maharaj, independence activist and social worker, was born in Radhu Village (1884–1984).

== Picture gallery ==
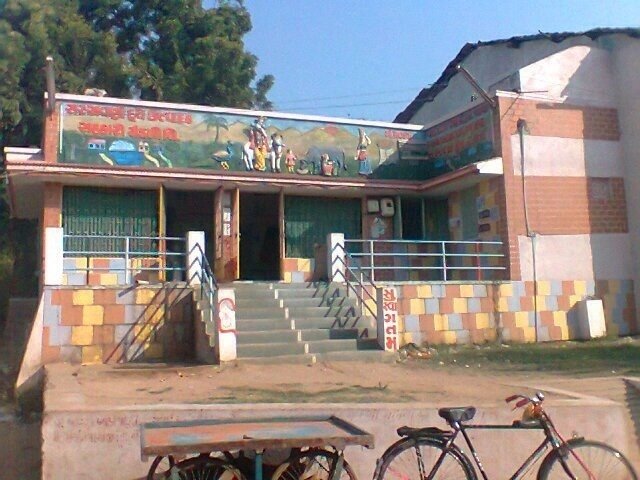
Sarsavani Milk Producers Co-Op Society

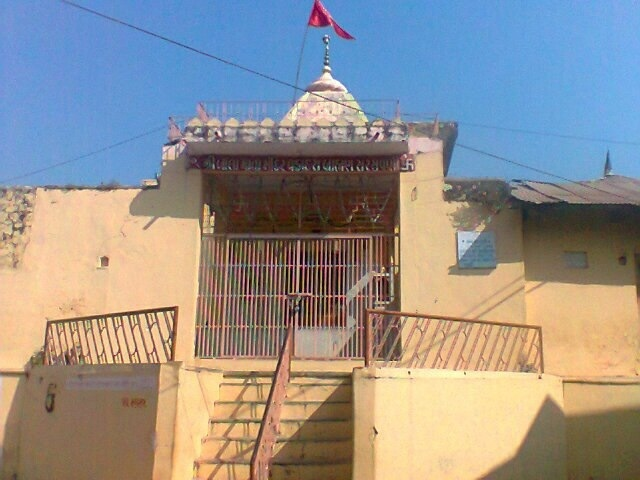
Temple of Bala mata

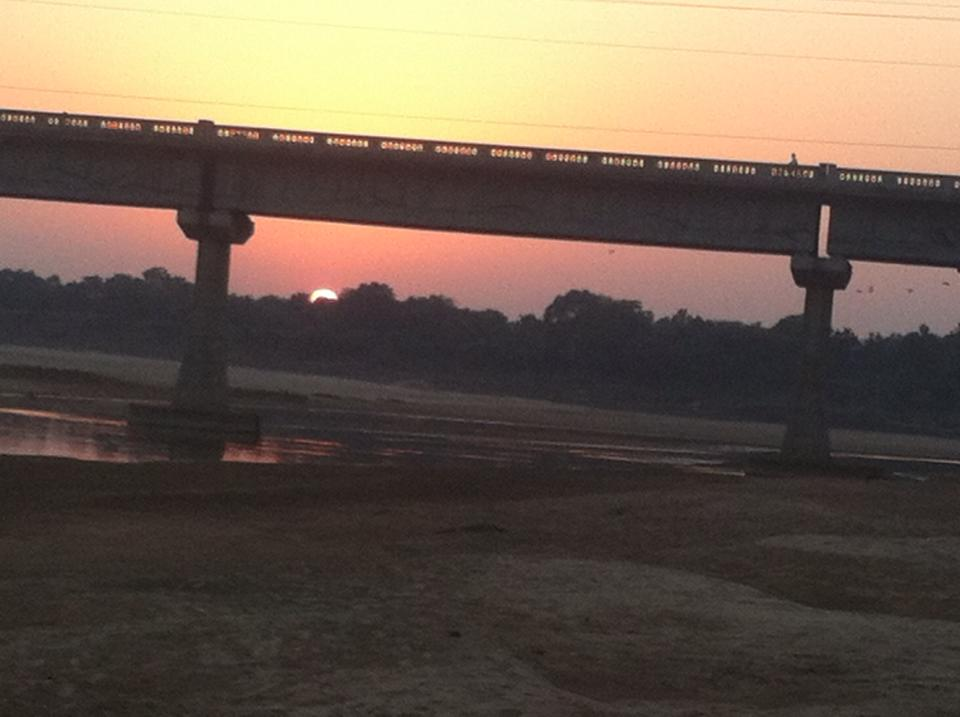
A bridge of Ravishankar Maharaj native village sarasavani to the road connecting haladharvas village.

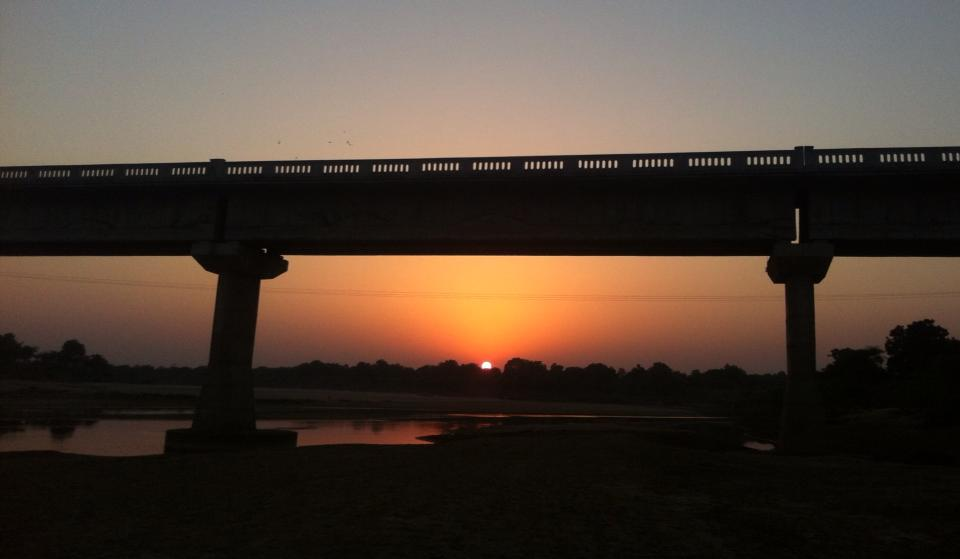
A bridge of Ravishankar Maharaj native village sarasavani to the road connecting haladharvas village.

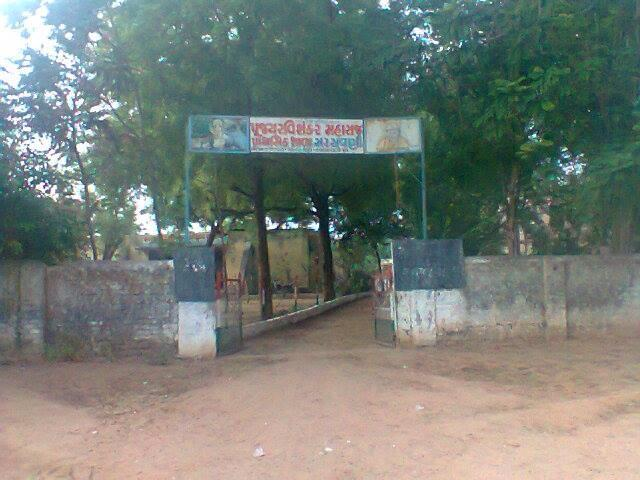
Ravishankar Maharaj Primary School.

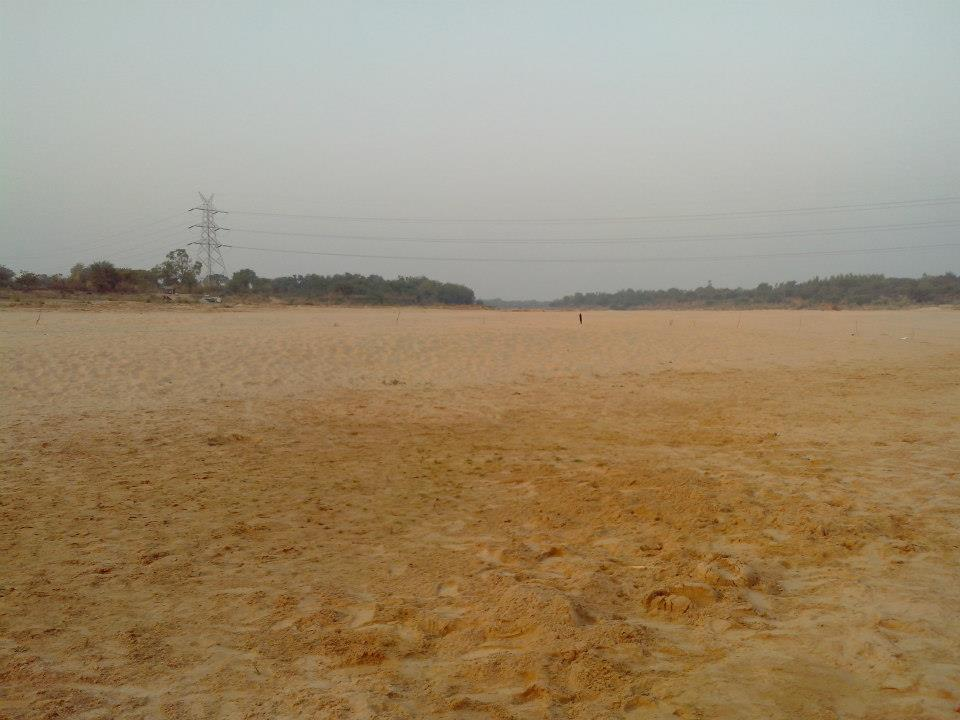
Bank of the Vatrak river (Moto aro) at Sarsavani

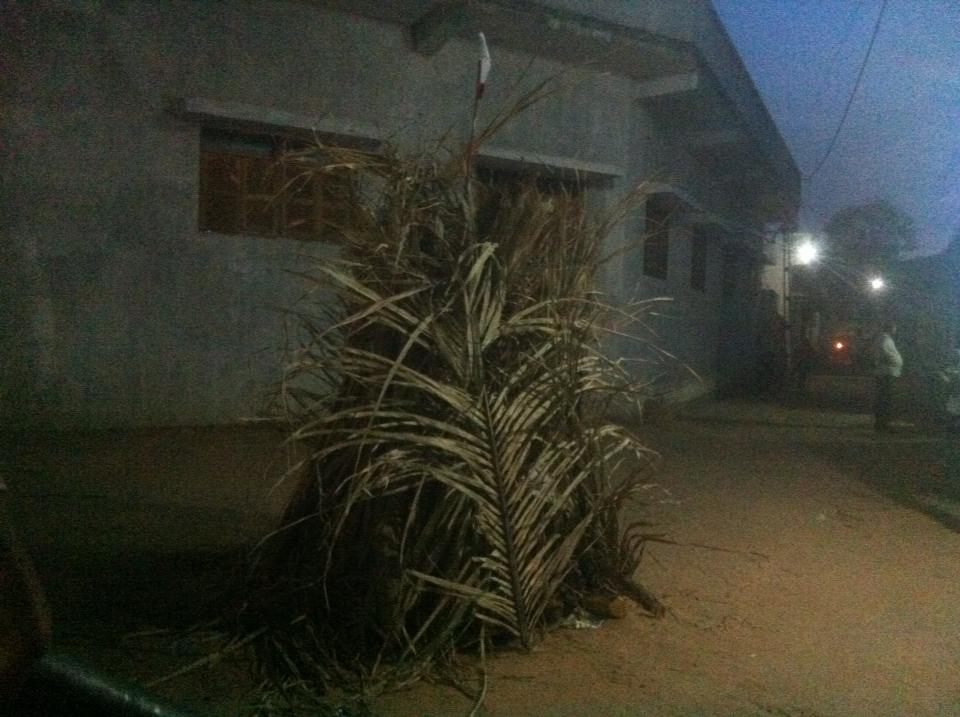
Holi Festival celebration at Bala Mata Sarsavani

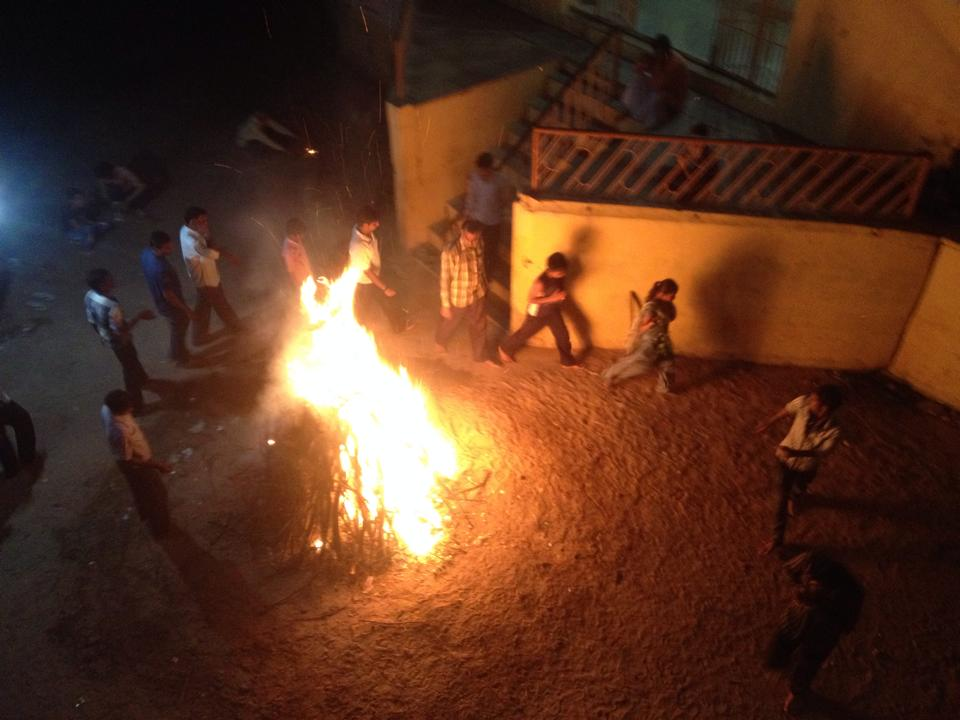
Holi Festival celebration at Bala Mata Sarsavani

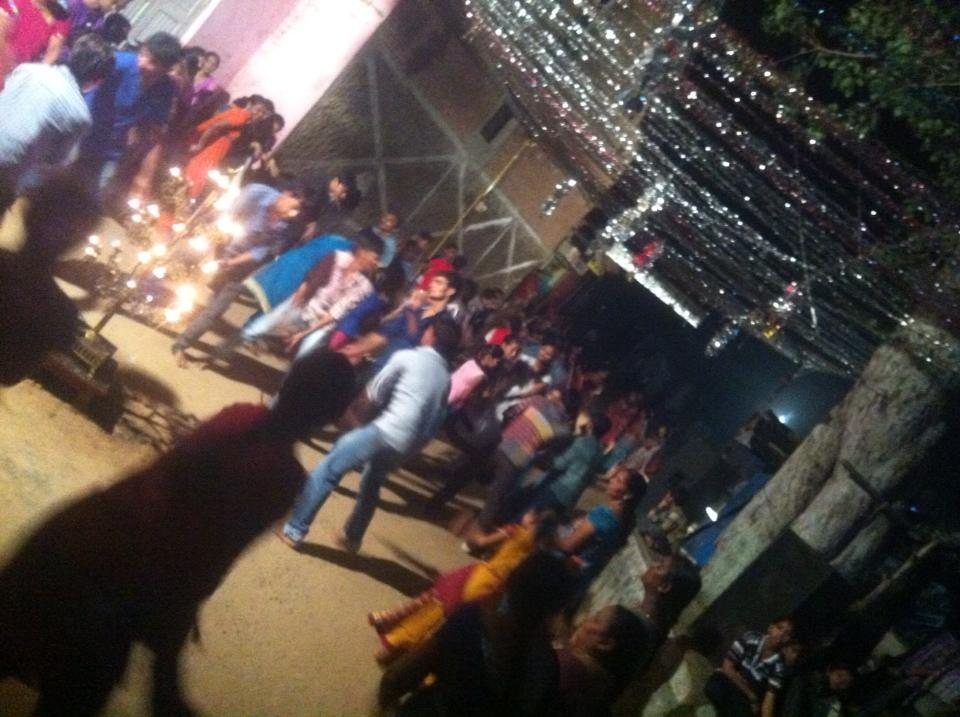
Navratri Festival celebration at Sarsavani Bazar

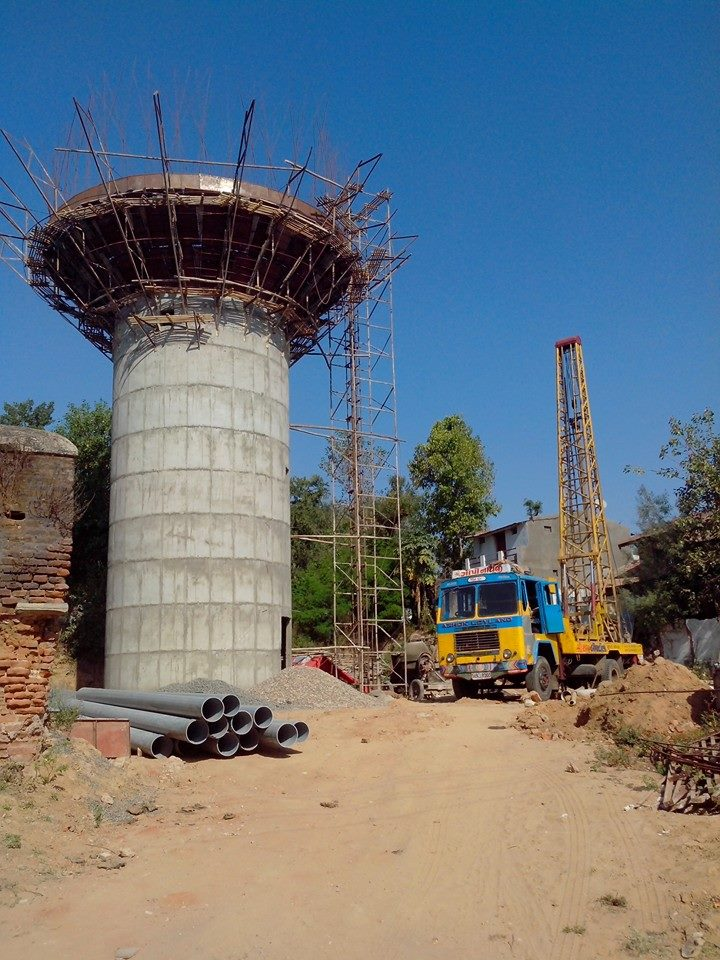
New water tank work in progress

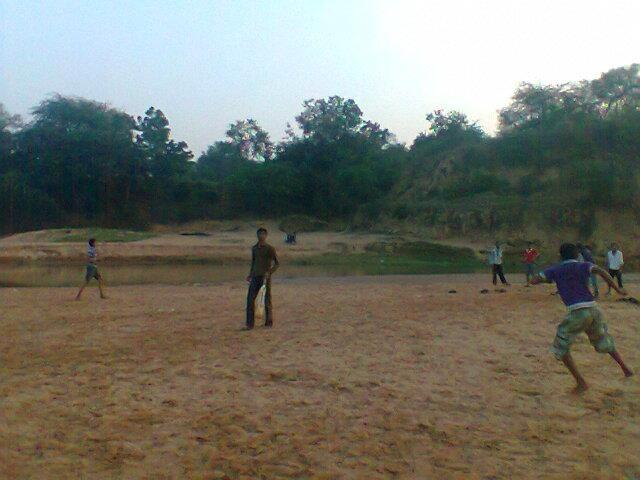
Playing cricket on the bank of the Vatrak River

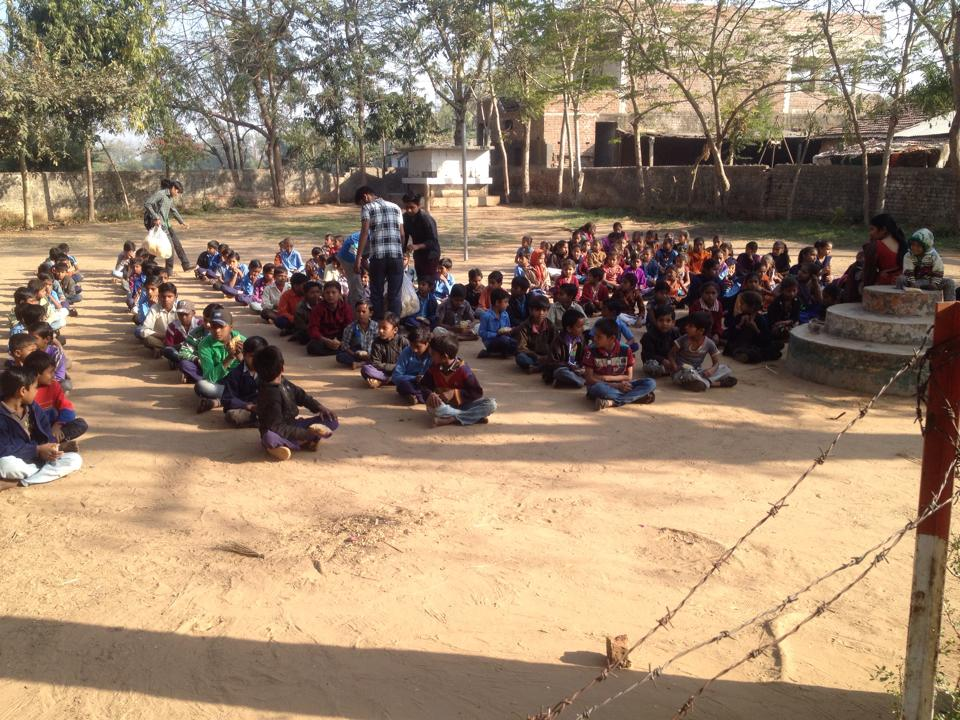
Ravishankar Maharaj Primary School.

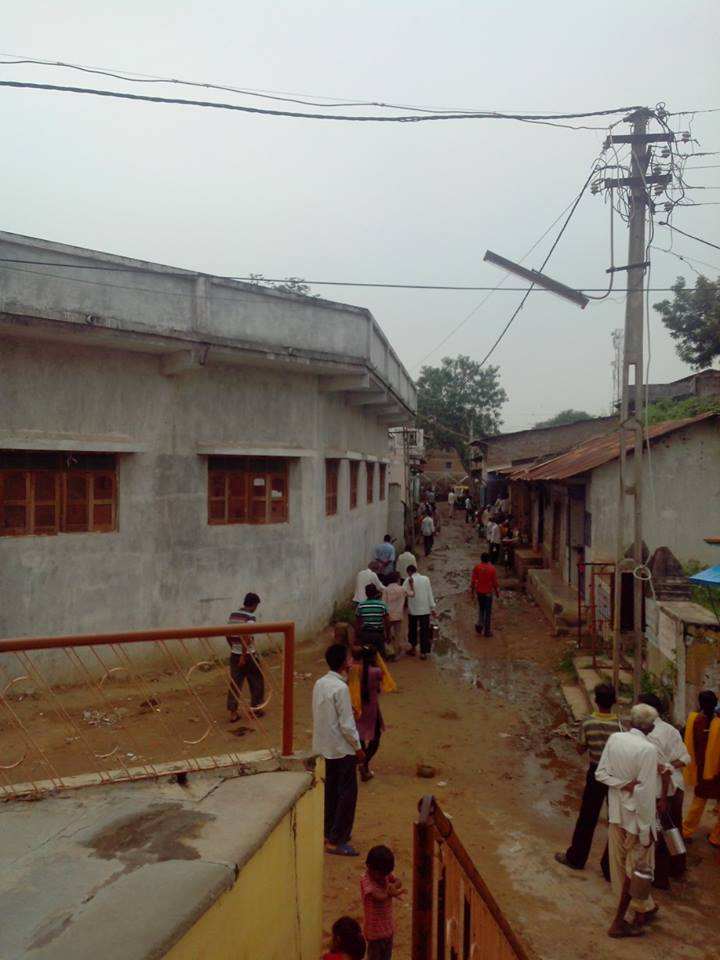
Sarsavani Bazar viewed from Bala Mata Temple

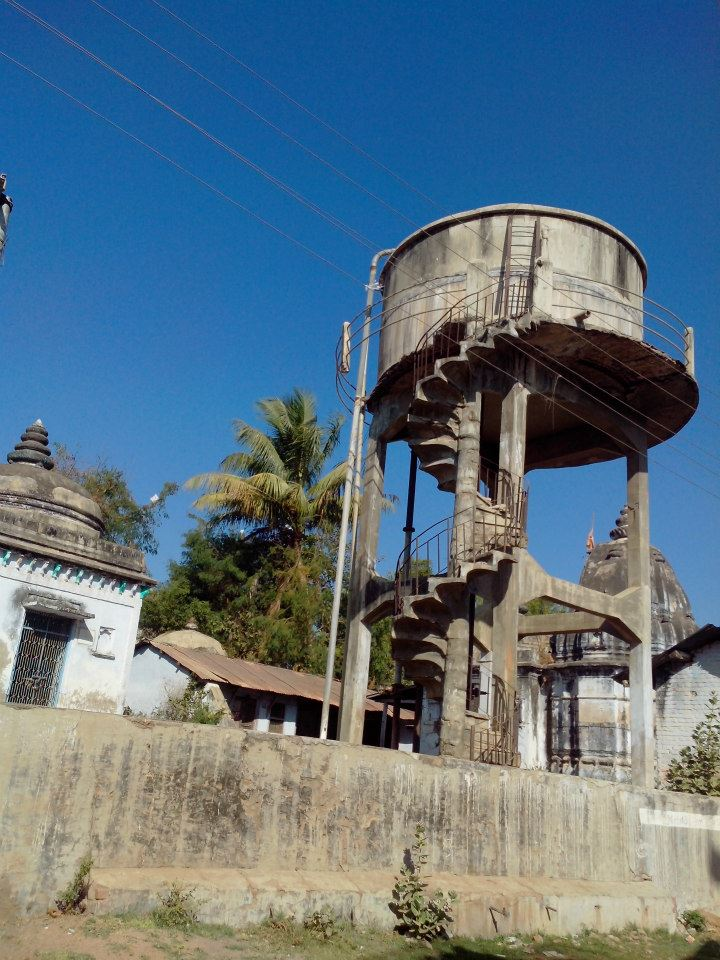
Sarsavani old water tank

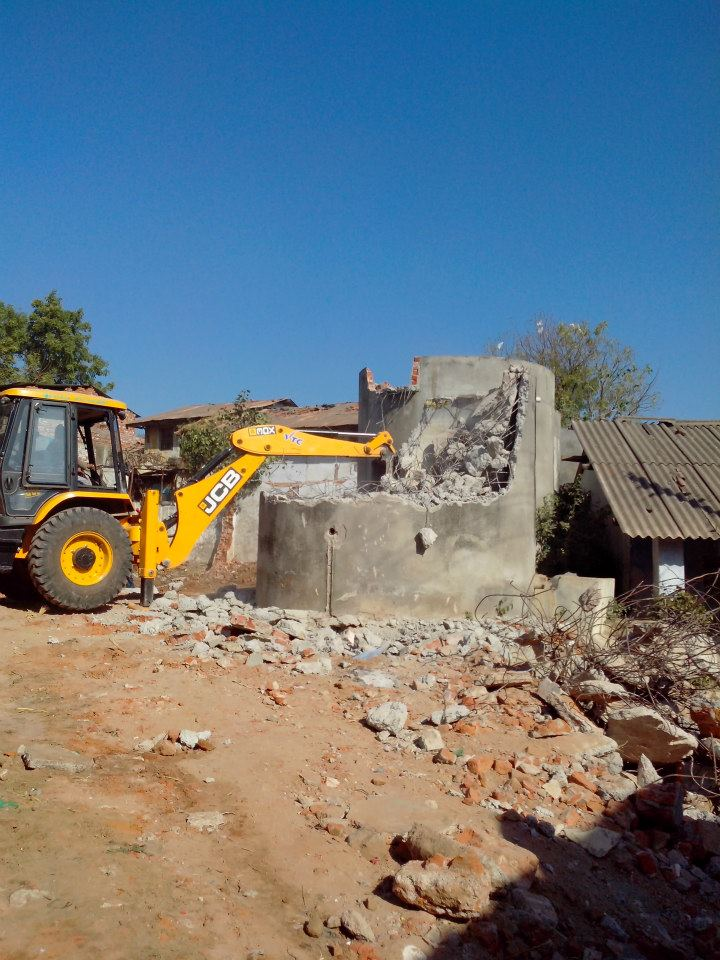
Sarsavani water tank work progress..

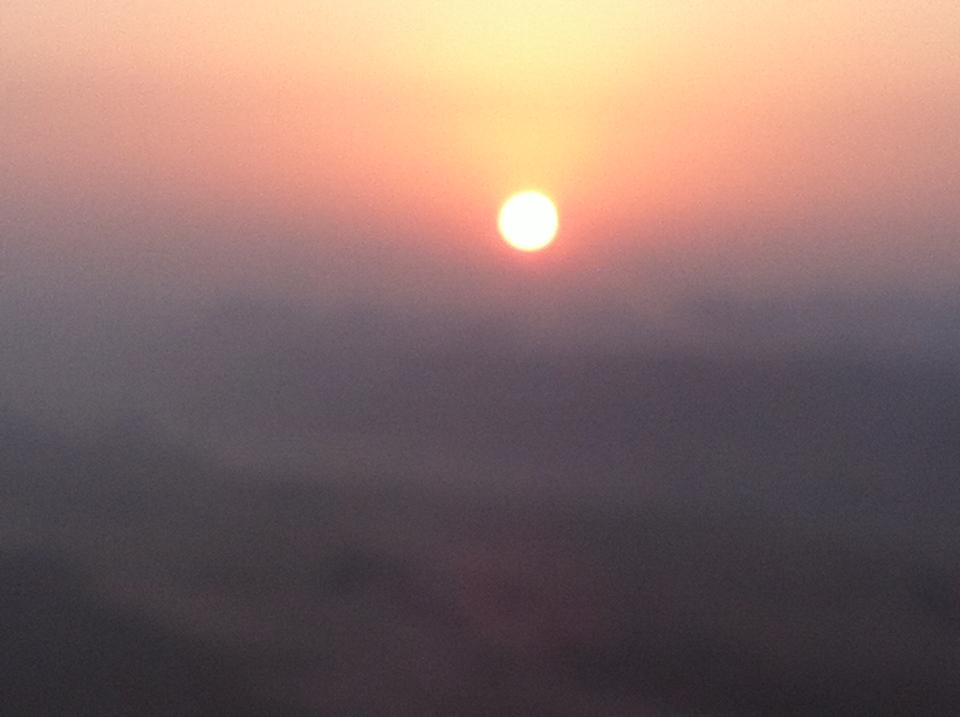
Vatrak river in the evening

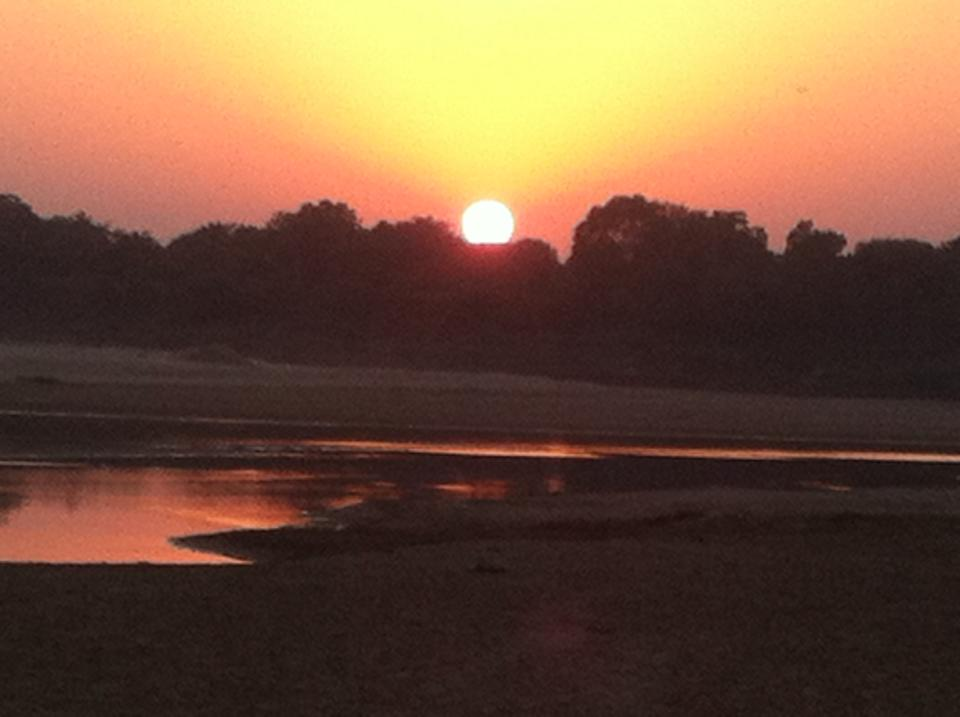
Vatrak river in the evening

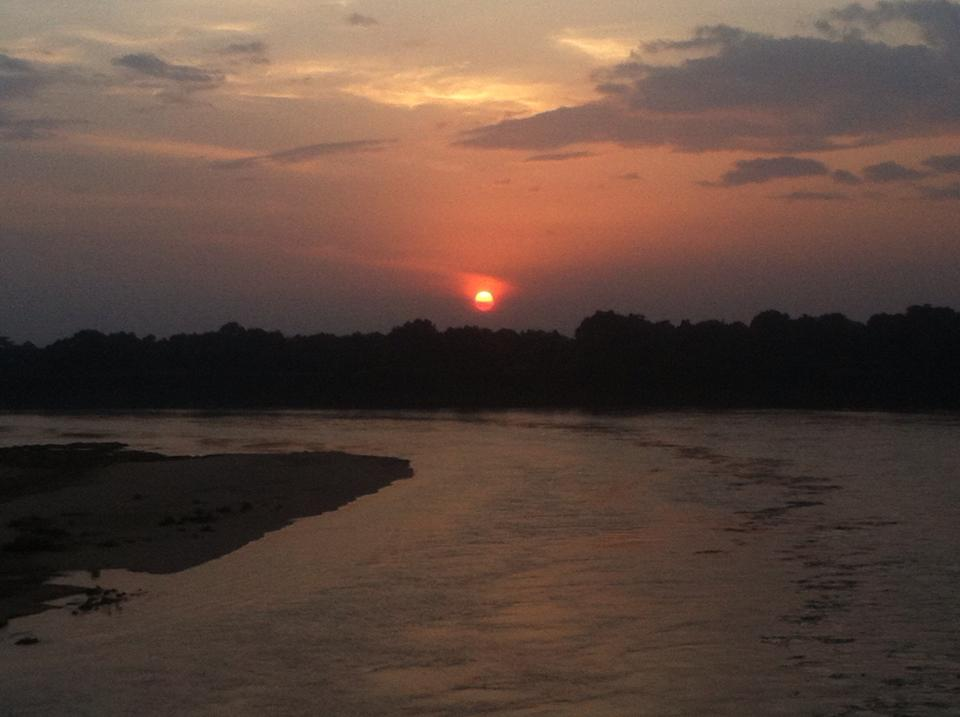
Vatrak river in the morning

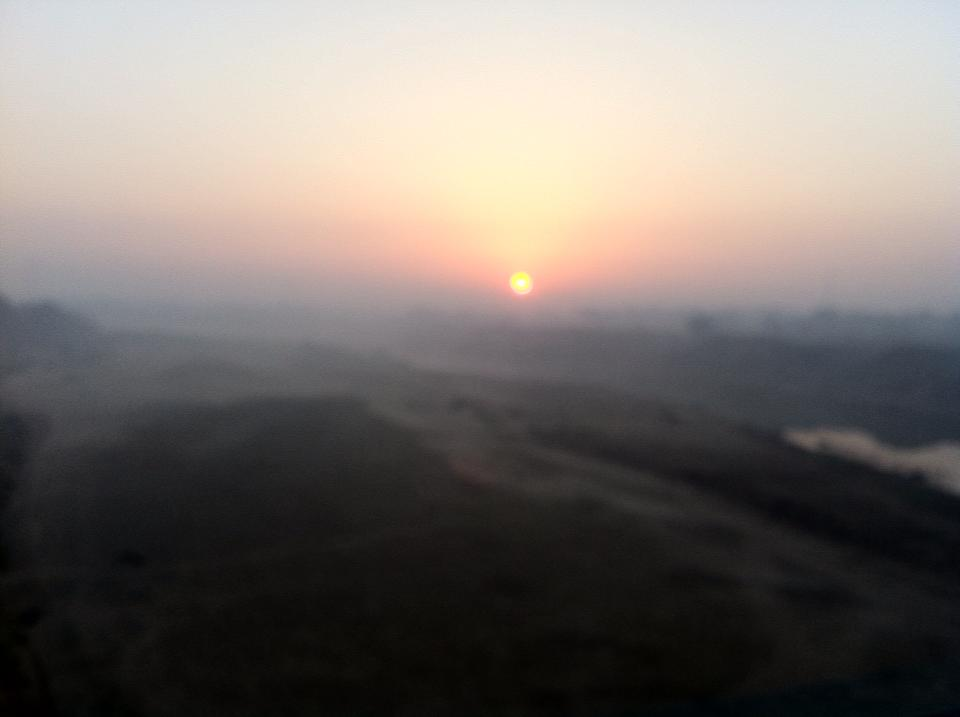
Vatrak river in the morning

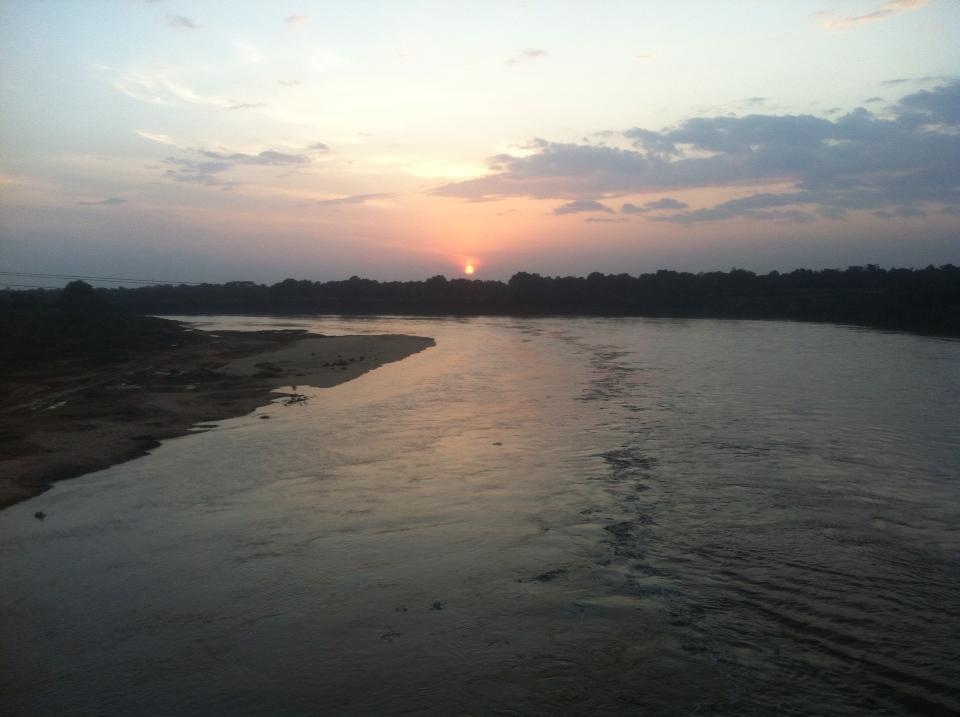
Vatrak river in the morning

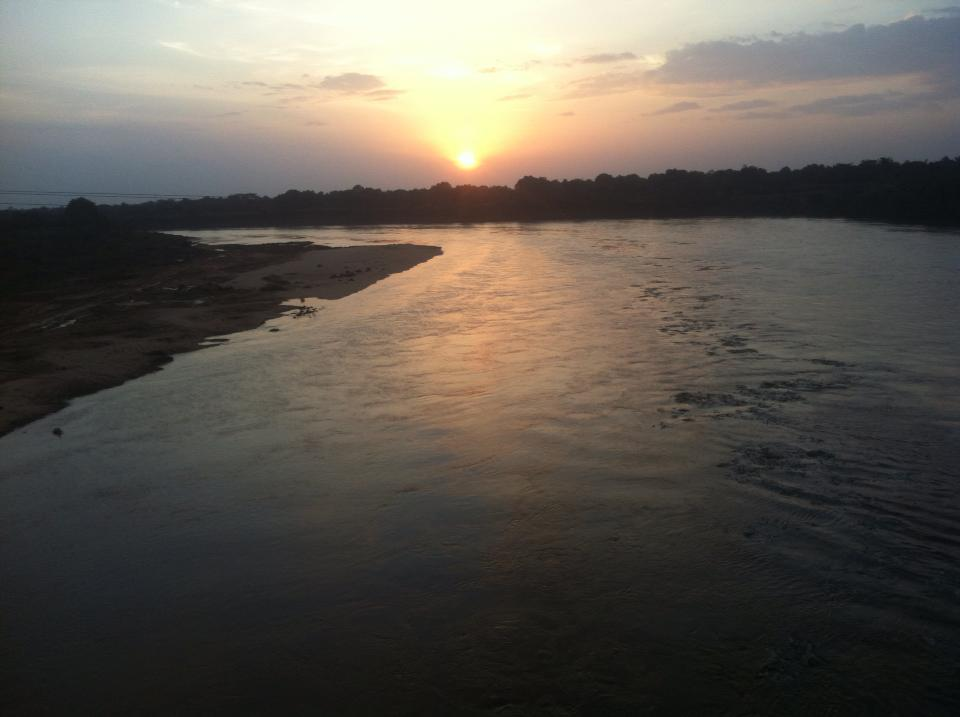
Vatrak river in the morning

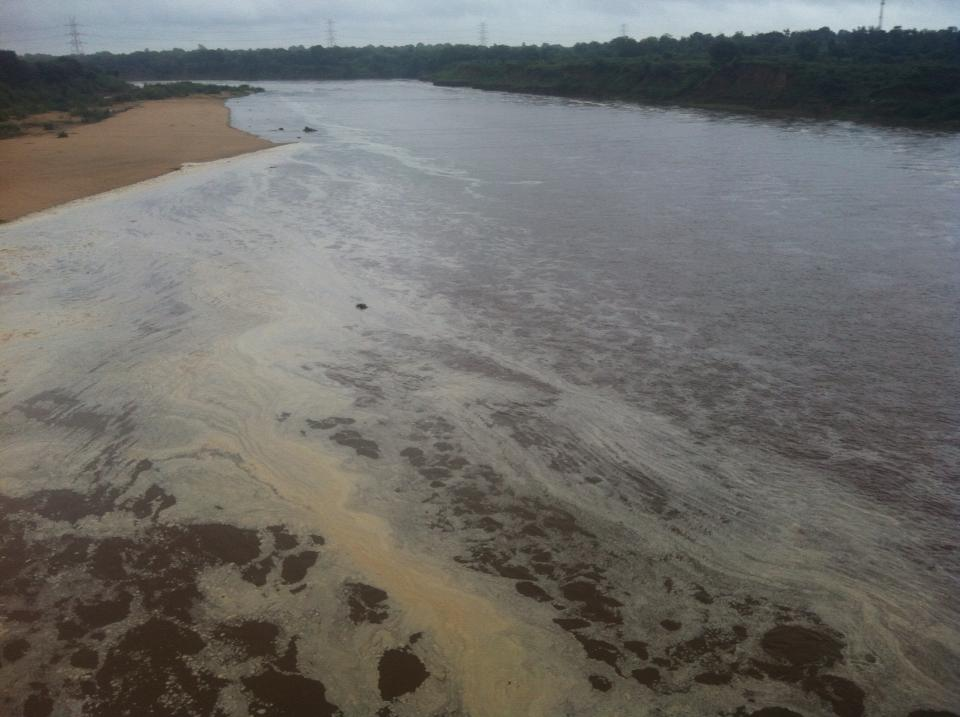
Vatrak river in the morning- rainy season

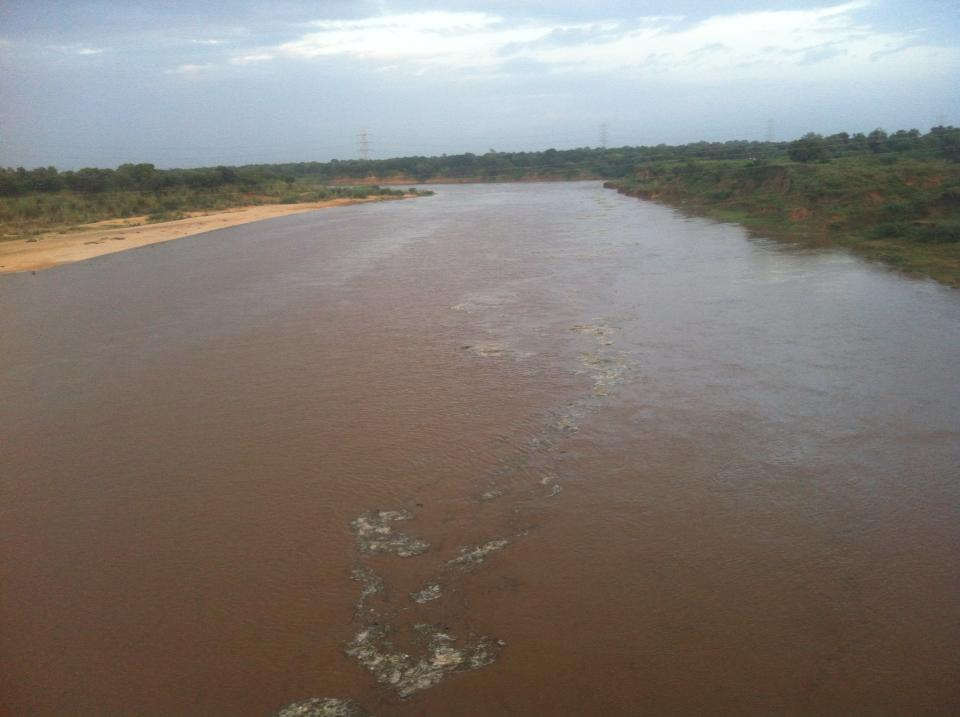
Vatrak river in the morning- rainy season
