= Ishwarsena =

- Rajan; Mathariputra; Mahaksatrapa
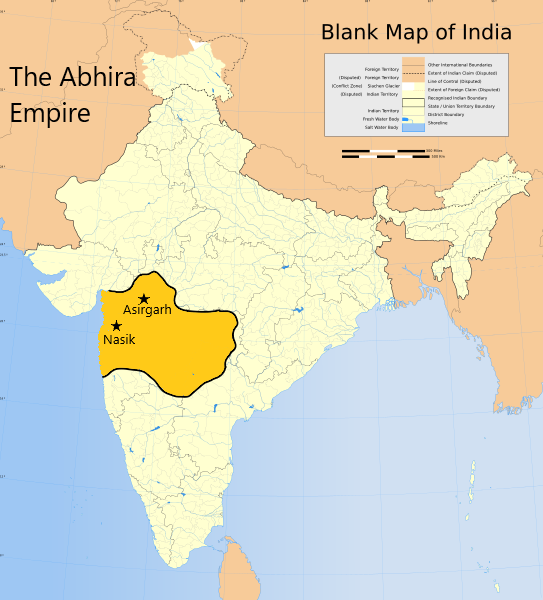
- Map of the Abhira Empire

2nd or 3rd Abhira king
- Predecessor: Sakasena alias Saka Satakarni
- Successor: Abhira Vashishthiputra Vasusena
- Issue: Abhira Vashishthiputra Vasusena?
- Dynasty: Abhira
- Father: Abhira Sivadatta
- Mother: Mathari

Mathariputra Ishwarsena or Mahaksatrapa Ishwarsena was the founder of the Abhira dynasty. He and his descendants, whose names occur in the Puranas, seem to have ruled over a large territory in the Deccan. He took the title of Rajan and an era was named after him. His descendants ruled for nine generations.

== Early life and ascension to the throne ==
Ishwarsena was the son of Abhira Sivadatta and his wife Mathari. Another king claiming to be a son of Mathari is Sakasena. He is identified with Saka Satakarni, whose coins have been found over Andhra Pradesh and is taken to be a Satavahana king and successor of Yajna Sri Satakarni. However, K.Gopalchari thinks that Sakasena was a Abhira king. Reasons:

- The name of Sakasena or Saka Satakarni does not occur in the Puranic genealogies of the Andhra-Satavahana kings. He claimed to be th son of Mathari, the wife of Abhira Sivadatta, as indicated by his epithet Mathariputra.
- The traditional title of Siri which is found on most coins and inscriptions of the Satavahanas is significantly absent in the case of this ruler.
- Considering the dynastic rivalry between the Saka Kshatrapas, the naming of a Satavahana prince with its main content as Saka is very unnatural and unlikely.
- The Abhiras were earlier in the service of the Saka rulers of Ujjaini, and in those days, feudatory chiefs used to name their sons after the names of their overlords. The name of Sakasena was probably a result of this practice. The suffix of Sena in his name also suggests that he was an Abhira king and related to Ishwarsena.

So this concludes that Ishwarsena's predecessor was his elder brother Sakasena, and he ascended the throne after his death. However, historian Ashvini Agrawal thinks he was a general in the service of Rudrasimha I who deposed his master in 188 A.D and ascended the throne. Ashvini Agrawal further says that Rudrasimha I soon deposed him and regained the throne in 190 A.D.

== Reign ==
Ishwarsena is the only confirmed ruler of his dynasty. He is mentioned in the Nasik cave inscription dated in his ninth regnal year. In the inscription, he is referred to have made two investments of 1,000 and 500 Karshapanas in trade guilds at Govardhana (Old Nasik), for the purpose of providing medicines for the sick monks living in the monasteries of the Nasik hills. The areas which he controlled included Lata, Aparanta, Khandesh, Ashmaka (Andhra), with Nasik and its adjoining areas as the core territory.

Ishwarsena started an era to commemorate his ascension in 284 or 249 AD, which later became known as the Kalachuri -Chedi era.

=== Numismatics and epigraphics ===
Coins of Ishwarsena are dated only in the first and second years of his reign and are found only in Saurashtra and Southern Rajasthan.

A number of feudatories of the Abhiras ruled in various parts of Maharashtra. One such dynasty founded by Ishwarsena is known from an inscription in cave XVII at Ajanta which mentions Ashmaka in verse 10.
