= Anjaneri =

Indian fort

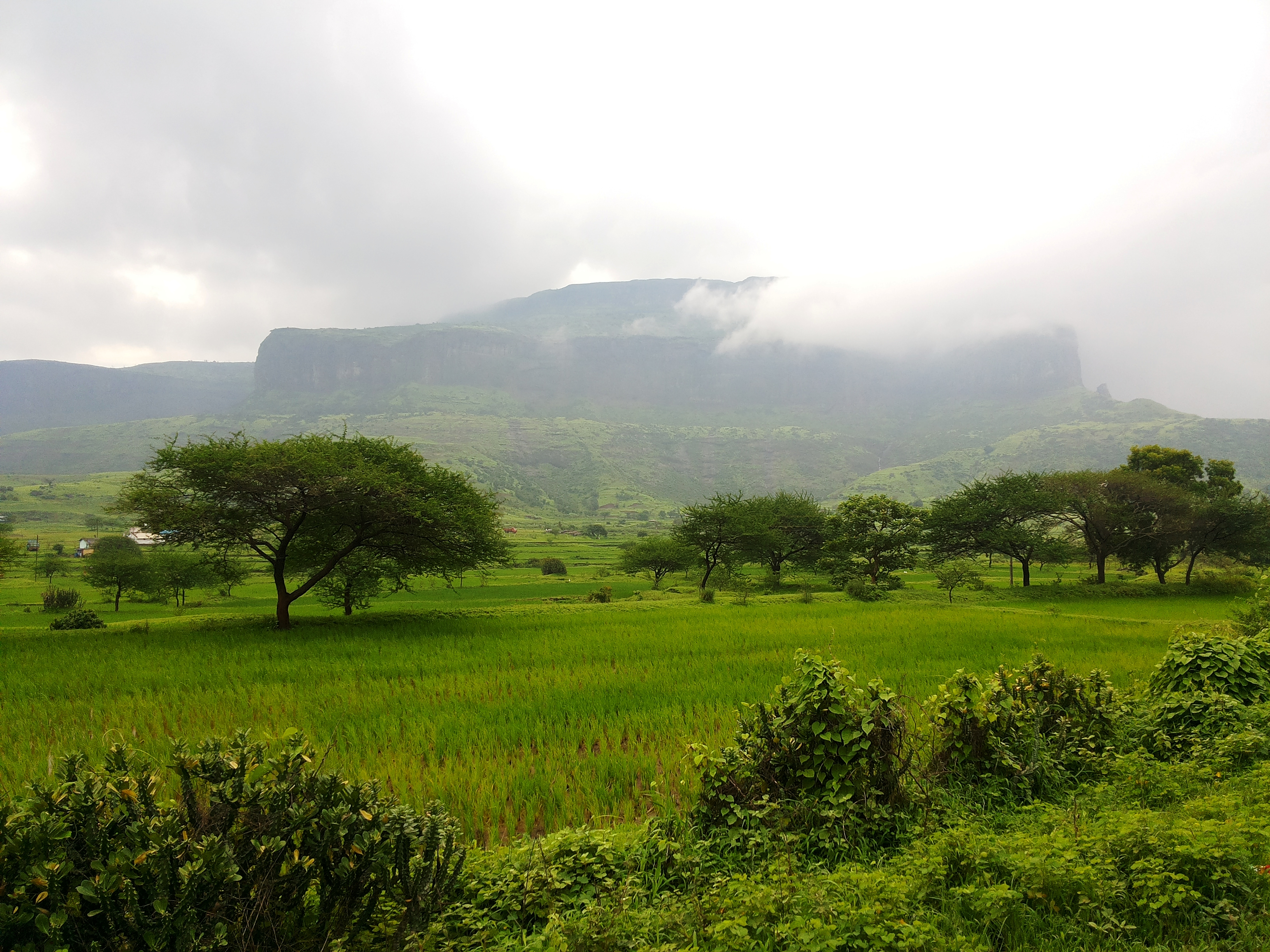
- Anjineri fort Nasik

Highest point
- Elevation: 1,280 m (4,200 ft)
- Coordinates: 19°55′N 73°34′E

Naming
- Native name: अंजनेरी किल्ला (Marathi)

Geography
- Location within Maharashtra
- Location: Nashik, Maharashtra, India
- Parent range: Trimbakeshwar

Geology
- Mountain type: hill fort

Anjaneri, one of the forts in the mountain range of Nasik-Trimbakeshwa. Anjaneri is located 20 km away from Nasik by Trimbak Road. It is a popular for Digmbar Jain caves, Temples and trekking spot, especially in the rainy season.

== Religious Significance ==
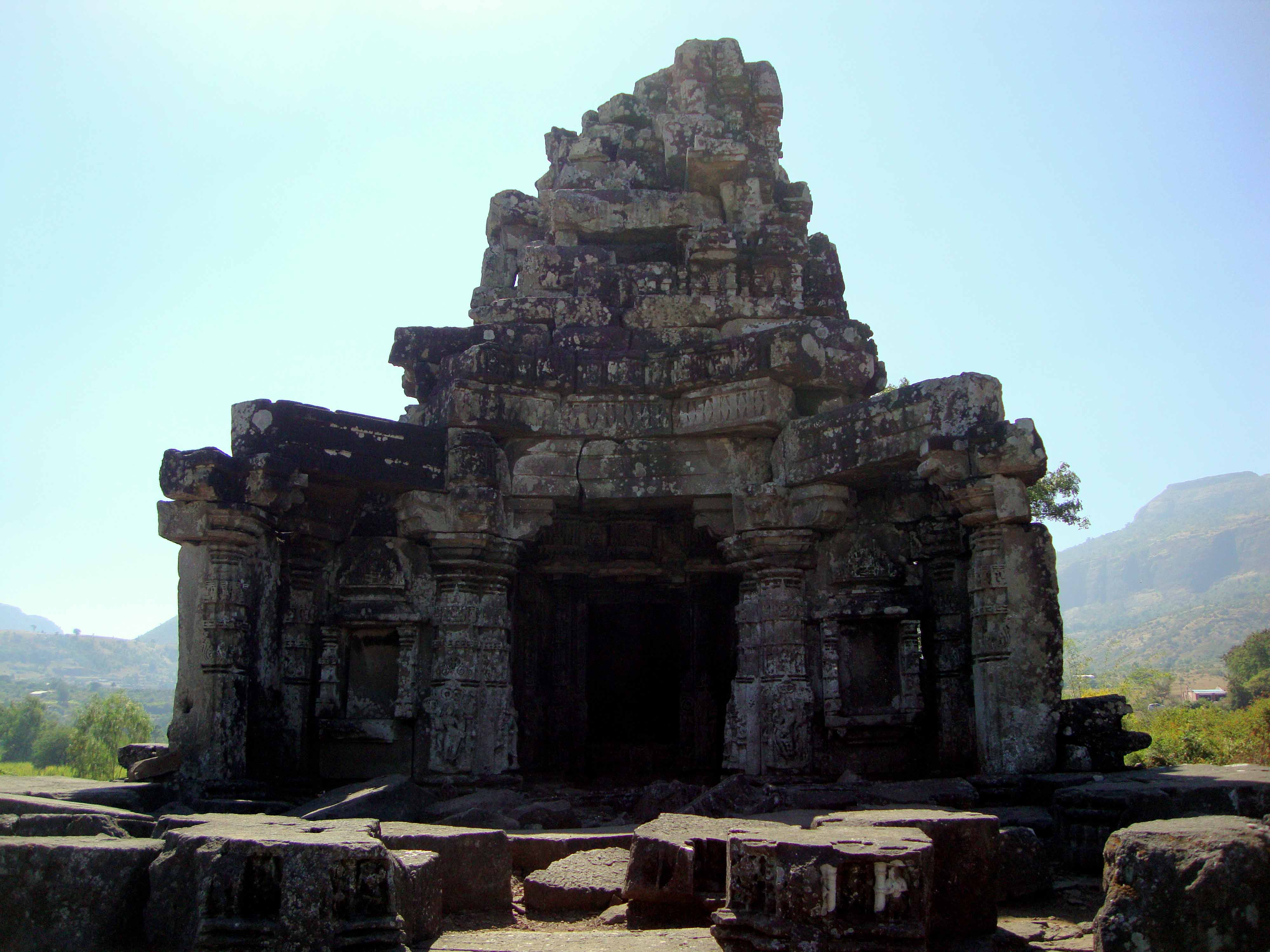
Jain temple

Anjaneri is an attraction of Nasik city, which is also an important fort in the Trimbakeshwar region. Situated at 4,264 feet (1,300 m) above sea level, it lies between Nasik and Trimbakeshwar near Godavari river. It neighbors the Brahmagiri range, significant in Hindu traditions as meditation spot of Sage Gautam. In some of the Puranas it is relayed that Hanuman's mother, Anjana Devi, was the daughter of Maharishi Gautama and Ahalya. When she refused to defend her mother against the accusation of adultery, she was cursed by Ahalya that she too would suffer shame by giving birth to a Vanara child before she was married. Anjana Devi, it is said, then resolved to undertake strict penance in the hills near her father's hermitage. Standing on one leg, she became so absorbed in meditation that an anthill is supposed to have grown around her. Due to the intensity of her tapas, Indra's throne began to shake and the gods were disturbed by the strong energies that were released. Sage Narada was dispatched to seek Shiva's help in containing these energies who then incarnated as her son Hanuman.

The Brahma Purana while extolling the greatness of the Godavari and the pilgrimage places along its course, narrates that a celestial nymph named Anjana mocked Indra for having a thousand eyes and she was cursed to be born on earth with a monkey face. Her friend, Adrika, also annoyed Indra by meowing like a cat and was cursed to be born as a human being with the face of a cat. Both the nymphs were born among the Vanaras and were later married to Kesari, the king of Anjaneri's Vanara Kingdom. When Sage Agastya took up residence in this forest, Anjana and her friend Adrika served him with great devotion and he granted them each the boon of having an illustrious son. While walking in the forest one day, Anjana attracted the wind god Vayu and Adrika attracted Nirṛti. In due course, Anjana gave birth to Hanuman and her friend to Adri. When their sons grew older, their divine fathers advised them to take their mothers on pilgrimage to the Godavari River. Anjana bathed at a sacred place called Anjana tirtha, while Adrika took a bath at Marjari tirtha, obtaining release from Indra's curse and regained their heavenly forms.

Anjaneri is the birthplace of Lord Hanuman, and is named after Lord Hanuman's mother, Anjani. The Bhavartha Ramayana of the famous Marathi saint-poet Eknath, states that Anjana Devi, intent on obtaining an exemplary son, performed severe austerities on top of the Anjaneri Hill for 7,000 years, with Shiva granting her boon by incarnating as her as son in the form of Hanuman.

== History ==
Archaeological remains in the Anjaneri region suggest that the area was inhabited during the early medieval period. A large group of rock-cut Jain caves found on the hill dates to approximately the 11th–12th centuries, indicating the presence of Jain communities and religious activity in the area.

Historical traditions also record that the region was once ruled by a local Abhira (Ahir) ruler named Veersen, who is believed to have briefly made Anjaneri his capital.

In the 18th century, this place was used by Raghunathrao Peshwa as a summer retreat when he was in exile. During the British Raj, the Christian missionaries of Saharanpur and Malegaon regularly visited Anjaneri during summer and held the service of the Church of England.

== Conservation ==
In 2017 the Anjaneri region was declared a conservation reserve under the Wildlife Protection Act by the Government of India to preserve the biodiversity and cultural heritage of the area.
