= Abhira people =

Historical people mentioned in the Mahabharata

The Abhira people (Devanagari: आभीर) were a legendary people mentioned in ancient Indian epics and scriptures. A historical people of the same name are mentioned in the Periplus of the Erythraean Sea. The Mahabharata describes them as living near the seashore and on the bank of the Sarasvati River, near Somnath in Gujarat and in the Matsya region also.

== History ==
Sunil Kumar Bhattacharya says that the Abhiras are mentioned in the first-century work of classical antiquity, the Periplus of the Erythraean Sea. He considers them to be a race rather than a tribe. Scholars such as Ramaprasad Chanda believe that they were Indo-Aryan peoples. But others, such as Romila Thapar, believe them to have been indigenous. The Puranic Abhiras occupied the territories of Herat; they are invariably juxtaposed with the Kalatoyakas and Haritas, the peoples of Afghanistan.

There is no certainty regarding the occupational status of the Abhiras, with ancient texts sometimes referring to them as pastoral cowherders, but at other times as plundering tribes. Along with the Vrishnis, the Satvatas, and the Yadavas, the Abhiras were followers of the Vedas, and worshipped Krishna, the head and preceptor of these tribes. In the Padma-puranas and certain literary works, these herds were known as ayars in Tamil, as they were known as Ahirs and Abhiras in North India.

=== Rule of the Konkan ===
From 203 to 270 the Abhiras ruled over the whole of the Deccan Plateau as a paramount power. The Abhiras could also be the successors of the Satvahanas.

=== Connection to modern Ahirs ===
According to Ganga Ram Garg, the modern-day Ahir caste are descendants of Abhira people and the term Ahir is the Prakrit form of the Sanskrit term Abhira. Bhattacharya says that the terms Ahir, Ahar and Gaoli are current forms of the word Abhira.

M. S. A. Rao and historians such as P. M. Chandorkar and T. Padmaja have explained that epigraphical and historical evidence exists for equating the Ahirs with the ancient Abhiras.

== Abhiras of classical age ==
During the reign of Samudragupta (c. 350), the Abhiras lived in Rajputana and Malava on the western frontier of the Gupta Empire. Historian Dineshchandra Sircar thinks of their original abode was the area of Abhiravan, between Herat and Kandahar, although this is disputed. Their occupation of Rajasthan also at later date is evident from the Jodhpur inscription of Samvat 918 that the Abhira people of the area were a terror to their neighbours, because of their violent demeanour. Abhiras of Rajputana were sturdy and regarded as Mlecchas, and carried on anti-Brahmanical activities. As a result, life and property became unsafe. Pargiter points to the Pauranic tradition that the Vrishnis and Andhakas, while retreating northwards after the Kurukshetra War from their western home in Dwarka and Gujarat, were attacked and broken up by the rude Abhiras of Rajasthan.

The Abhiras did not stop in Rajasthan; some of their clans moved south and west reaching Saurashtra and Maharashtra and taking service under the Satavahana dynasty and the Western Satraps. Also founded a kingdom in the northern part of the Maratha country, and an inscription of the ninth year of the Abhira king Ishwarsena.
