= Eki Movement =

Tribal movement in Rajasthan region, British India during 1921 to 1922

The beginning of the Eki Movement is generally attributed to the events at the Matrikund fair in Chittod. Here, a group of adivasis agreed to desist from paying taxes to jagirdars until the Maharana addressed the problems with the jagirdari system.

== Beginnings of the Movement ==
The immediate inspiration for the movement was Motilal Tejawat's exposure to the Bijolia movement. Pamphlets associated with the Bijolia movement were circulating throughout Mewar around 1920. Tejawat distributed copies of these pamphlets in Jharol thikana, whose jagirdar was known to oppress adivasis and followed up by calling a series of meeting in adivasi villages in the area, leading to formation of a committee that sought to articulate the grievances and demands of the adivasi peasantry.

In May 1921, Tejawat was able to utilize a large gathering of adivasi peasants at the annual peasant fair Matri Mundiya near Chittor to spread his message and mobilize his followers on the issues of begar and unfair taxation. After the fair, a large number of protesting peasants marched to Udaipur to seek an audience with the Maharana who agreed to meet them and conceded some, but not all demands. Three important issues on which the Maharana granted no concession were: the use of forests by adivasis, begar, and the rounding up of adivasis for the royal shikhar (hunt).

== Support of Reformist Press ==
The reformist newspaper 'Navin Rajasthan' strongly supported the Eki Movement. The newspaper condemned the violence against the movement in the states of Idar and Sirohi, and Vijay Singh Pathik wrote a series of articles highlighting the conditions of the adivasis that gave rise to the movement. Navin Rajasthan sent Ram Narain Chaudhary to study the situation. The newspapers 'Lokvani' and 'Praja Sevak' also published articles on the conditions of the peasants associated with the Eki Movement.

== No support of Indian National Congress ==
Gandhi did not approve of Tejawat's methods and distanced himself from Tejawat in an article in Young India:

I hear that a gentleman by name Motilal Pancholi hailing from Udaipur claims to be my disciple and to preach temperance and what not among the rustics of the Rajputana States. He is reported to be surrounded by an armed crowd of admirers and establishing his kingdom or some other -dom wherever he goes. He claims too, miraculous powers. He or his admirers are reported to have done some destructive work. I wish that people will once and for all understand that I have no disciples.[6].

== Violent suppression of movement ==
On March 7, 1922, several thousand agitators gathered in the village of Palchitaria in Idar State (the village was renamed Dadhvav and now lies in Vijaynagar taluka, Sabarkantha district in present-day Gujarat). Troops of the Mewar Bhil Corps under the command of Major H.G. Sutton opened fire on the crowds. While Major Sutton described the engagement as a 'skirmish' in which 22 persons were killed, local oral tradition claims that between 1,000 and 1,500 were killed. Tejawat himself managed to escape the carnage, and the movement continued for another two months.

The events at Dadhvav received little coverage in the then-contemporary press, and is often an ignored chapter in later historical accounts. While some claim that this oversight is because "those killed were poor, illiterate tribals", at least one historian attributes the oversight to the fact that "Motilal Tejawat's movement did not conform to Gandhain precepts...[and]...publicity about the massacre did not at the moment accord with the overall political agenda of the nationalist leadership."

On May 8, 1922, the villages of Bhula and Balohiya were besieged by police who fired shots on the Bhil residents and set fire to houses. According to one journalistic account of the event, 1,800 Bhils were killed and 640 houses were burnt or destroyed. By the end of May 1922, the movement had "all but collapsed."
