= Fateh Karan Charan =

Leader of the Bijolia Movement

- Occupations: Revolutionary, poet
- Known for: Leading the Bijolia Peasant Movement

Fateh Karan Charan was an early 20th-century Indian revolutionary and poet from Rajasthan. He led the Bijolia Peasant Movement in its early stage in the Mewar region of British India.

== Early life ==
Fateh Karan Charan was born in Ujlan village in Jaislamer district. He was the third son of his father. His father, Nathuram Ji Ujjwal, was a scholar, poet and jagirdar of Ujlan. His birth name, given by rishis, was Vijakaran Charan. After some time, he left Jaisalmer and moved to Udaipur during the period of maharana sajjan singh.

== Bijolia Movement ==
Bijolia was a jagir in the Mewar State, it had a large population of peasants who were burdened with multiple taxes (86 kinds in total) and resentment grew among them against the feudal lord of the jagir. In 1906, Prithvi Singh, upon becoming the Thakur of Bijolia, raised the taxes to fulfill the 'Talvar-Bandhi' tax he owed to the Maharana of Mewar. Soon a movement began against the increase in taxes and spread to nearby estates.

In 1913, about 15,000 farmers, under the leadership of Fateh Karan Charan, launched a 'No Tax' campaign under which they decided to leave the lands uncultivated and instead farm the rented plots in the neighbouring areas of Bundi, Gwalior and Mewar states. This resulted in untilled lands all across Bijolia and led to a massive decline in the estate's revenue in addition to food shortage.

== As a poet ==
Fateh Karan Charan also composed songs against the authorities including the Munsarim, police, advocates of the State and the Thanedar (inspector) denouncing their deeds and raised questions on their character.

== Suppression of the movement ==
Authorities resorted to suppressive measures and the Maharana, upon witnessing the rise of peasantry, sided with the Thakur of Bijolia. Due to his role in the peasant movement, Fateh Karan Charan was stripped of his jagir (feudal-grant) and was exiled from Mewar.

== Next phase ==
In 1915, Fateh Karan Charan, along with Braham Deo and Sadhu Sitaram Das, met Vijay Singh Pathik(alias Bhoop Singh) at Chittor and decided to continue their movement and launch agitation against the cruelties of the jagirdars.
