= Naga dynasty =

Naga dynasty may refer to these dynasties of ancient India:

- Nagas of Padmavati, 3rd-4th century in northern India
- Nagas of Vidisha, 1st-century BCE in central India
- The rulers of the legendary Naga Kingdom

== See also ==
- Naga (disambiguation)
