= Ram Narayan Chaudhary =

Indian freedom fighter and social reformer (1895–1989)

- Born: 1 August 1895; Neem Ka Thana, Rajasthan
- Died: 4 April 1989 (aged 93); Ajmer, Rajasthan
- Education: Maharaja College, Jaipur
- Years active: 1914–1989
- Organization(s): Indian National Congress, Rajasthan Seva Sangh, Bharat Sevak Sangh, Gram Sahyog Samaj
- Notable work: Bapu: Meine Kya Dekha Kya Samjha; Nehru: In His Own Words
- Movement: Indian Independence Struggle, Bijolia movement
- Spouse: Anjana Devi Chaudhary (m. 1911; died 1981)
- Children: Pratap, Sita, Subhadra
- Website: http://ramnarayanchaudhary.org/

Ram Narayan Chaudhary (1 August 1895 – 4 April 1989) was a Gandhian social reformer, anti-colonial nationalist, writer, and publisher, from Rajasthan in India who contributed over three decades of his life to the Indian independence movement.

He employed protest techniques such as satyagraha, non-cooperation, and non-violent resistance during Indian independence movement and in his crusade to abolish taxes on landless labourers and farmers imposed by feudal lords in Rajputana region. Chaudhary was closely associated with Harijan Sevak Sangh and toured the southern parts of India with Gandhi in the latter's campaign to rid the evil of untouchability.

He spent almost six years in prison serving five different jail terms due to his civic rights activism in pre-independent India, including over two years during the Quit India movement.

Chaudhary wrote and edited 13 books, and translated over 65 canonical texts by Mahatma Gandhi and his close associates given his vast knowledge of languages viz. English, Hindi, Gujarati, Urdu, Persian, and Sanskrit. A renowned journalist, Chaudhary established and ran several newspapers in Hindi and English, including Rajasthan Kesari, Naveen Rajasthan, Navjyoti (weekly), and Naya Rajasthan during various phases in his lifetime. Born into a family of privilege in present-day Rajasthan, Chaudhary, as a graduate student in Jaipur, was initially drawn towards revolutionary activities against British Raj inspired by the writings of Aurobindo Ghose, Giuseppe Mazzini, and Bal Gangadhar Tilak.

However, increasingly in his twenties, he adopted Gandhi's ideological repertoire in his political activism. He and his wife, Anjana Devi, gave up family wealth and settled for a life of self-austerity on the principles of aparigraha. In the 1920s, Chaudhary was one of the leading figures of Bijolia Satyagraha demanding revocation of feudal taxes on farmers, labourers and bonded slaves in Rajputana princely states. His wife, Anjana Devi, too, was an equal partner in this endeavour, especially in mobilising women. Later, he worked to spread agricultural knowledge and formal education among the deprived Bhils, a tribal group in Rajasthan.

His social work took place on the direct advice and instructions of Gandhi. He stayed at Gandhi's Sabarmati Ashram in Ahmedabad a couple of times in the late-1920s and 1940s. At Gandhi's ashram at Wardha, where he resided for three years with his family, Chaudhary handled Gandhi's correspondence besides managing important administrative duties at the ashram as Gandhi's trusted aide.

After India's independence, Chaudhary lived for a decade in Delhi working to remove social discrimination and promoting knowledge of governance among public servants and elected local-level leaders. In Delhi, he grew close to Jawaharlal Nehru, India's first Prime Minister, frequently interviewing him and exchanging letters. He lived the last two decades of his life in Ajmer in his home state of Rajasthan.

== Early life (1895–1914) ==
=== Birth and family background ===
Ram Narayan Chaudhary was born on 1 August 1895 at Neem Ka Thana, a town in Sikar district of present-day Rajasthan state. His father, Muralidhar Chaudhary, served as the chief advocate estimating taxes on the farm produces in Sikar princely state. His mother, Chhotibai Chaudhary, was the daughter of Manikaran Harbhajanka, a panch of Shrimadhopur, a municipality in Rajasthan's Sikar district. Ram Narayan was third of his parents’ seven children, four of whom were boys and three girls. Durgaprasad, one of his younger brothers, was a Gandhian nationalist and publisher who was jailed during the Quit India movement.

Chaudhary was born into a wealthy Marwadi with nobility background. His father, Muralidhar Chaudhary, inherited his aristocrat position in Sikar state from his elder brother, Chainsukhji, who had shifted from Kanwat to Neem Ka Thana to become a zamindar’s legal counsel. Due to their services to the princely state, they were endowed with the titular surname of Chaudhary, generally associated with the Jat caste in northern India. Muralidhar Chaudhary was also involved in agriculture and money lending business.

=== Education ===
Chaudhary's formal education began at a maktab near his family home. At this maktab, he learnt Urdu under Mirza Rahim Baig, a strict disciplinarian. Soon, his study of Sanskrit language began under a local Brahmin priest living in Neem Ka Thana.

At the age of eight, Chaudhary was sent to Jobner with his brother Chagganlal to study at a school run by Thakur Karni Singh, an Arya Samaj devotee. His study of languages, including English, continued at this school where he remained till class six. Due to his academic excellence, Chaudhary was double promoted and was able to skip classes at Jobner school.

After class six, Chaudhary was shifted to Maharaja High School, located next to the famous Hawa Mahal in Jaipur city. At sixteen, Chaudhary excelled with First Class in his matriculation examination. Consequently, in 1911, he joined Maharaja College in Jaipur, situated right next to his high-school, to study engineering.

=== Intellectual awakening ===
At Maharaja College, Chaudhary could access and read newspapers for the first time in his life. He became curious about political history and national movements. His knowledge base expanded as he acquainted himself with not only the Indian movement for independence but also various nationalist struggles across the world, such as Japan's fight against Russian Empire in the early 1900s. He drew inspiration from the writings of Aurobindo Ghose, Lokmanya Tilak, and Swami Vivekananda.

On the advice of Arjun Lal Sethi, Chaudhary joined the Kranti Dal (Revolutionary Corps), to contribute to Indian nationalist movement, along with Chhotelal Jain and Gulab Singh Sogani circa 1912–13. It became his route to intellectual awakening and broadening of the mind. He read Bankimchandra Chattopadhyay's Anandmath, Lala Har Dayal's articles, Vinayak Savarkar's Indian War of Independence as part of his induction at Kranti Dal. In this time, he happened to appreciate the Italian nationalist Giuseppe Mazzini's memoirs and Morgan Schuster's Strangling of Persia. He also became interested in the work of the Theosophical Society. On his elder brother's advice, Chaudhary took and passed a few examinations, known as inter-science examinations, though he rejected a scholarship to study in Japan and also left Maharaja College in Jaipur to contribute to the nationalist cause.

During his college days, Chaudhary married Anjana Devi, daughter of a wealthy trader from Srimadhopur, through an arranged marriage. She also donned the role of his associate in the Indian independence struggle.

== Struggle for Indian Independence (1914–1947) ==
=== From revolutionary activism to non-violence ===
As part of Kranti Dal in his initial years of association with the Indian freedom movement, Chaudhary became a conduit for supplying messages and information to revolutionaries spread in parts of north India, including those associated with the Delhi conspiracy case - a plot to assassinate Lord Hardinge, the then Viceroy of India. Circa 1915, Chaudhary and Jaychand were selected to murder British Raj's Home member Sir Reginald Craddock. Chaudhary was assigned this task by Pratapsinh on the advice of Chhotelal Jain. However, Jaychand's reluctance made it impossible for Chaudhary to undertake the killing. Ultimately, Pratapsinh was selected to kill Craddock but as Craddock fell sick, it could not be carried out either.

In 1915, after a student killed a senior English police official in Calcutta, Gandhi who had arrived in India from South Africa denounced this violent act in a public address. This speech urging masses to adopt non-violent means to oppose colonialism profoundly impacted Chaudhary. Earlier, while studying at Jaipur's Maharaja College, he had already been introduced to Mahatma Gandhi's anti-colonial activism undertaken in South Africa through writings of prominent nationalists such as Krishnakant Malviya and Ganeshshankar Vidyarthi.

Nevertheless, Chaudhary's faith in non-violent resistance was still not resolute as he was briefly wooed by Marxist thoughts, especially after the Russian revolution. But as Gandhi's influence in India began to increase in the late 1910s and early 1920s, Chaudhary took more interest in his philosophy and established contact with Gandhi. At this time, revolutionary anarchists such as Sethi and Pathik, who were the first mentors of Chaudhary, came to respect Gandhi and often sought his advice; Sethi had become the most crucial functionary of Congress in Rajasthan by 1921. Soon, Chaudhary renounced violent means for revolutionary activities and accepted the Gandhian idea of nonviolent resistance.

Chaudhary taught in Ramgarh at an industrialist's school after leaving his college education. In mid-1917, he left this job to fully devote himself to the independence movement and contacted Jamnalal Bajaj, a well-known businessperson, a follower of Gandhi associated with Indian independence movement, and one of Chaudhary's life-long mentors.

Soon, to his surprise, Gandhi personally wrote to Chaudhary a letter asking about his availability to work in Bihar's Champaran under Chhotelal Jain, a prominent student leader who had given up violence after his contact with Gandhi and whom Chaudhary already knew. In another letter, Gandhi wrote to Bajaj praising Chaudhary's teaching abilities. However, Chaudhary was unable to proceed to Champaran as he had committed to teaching at Wardha's Marwadi Education Society run by Bajaj and Krishnadas Jaju. Later, through Chhotelal Jain, Chaudhary found out that Gandhi was particularly impressed by his readiness to give up casteist norms of untouchability.

Chaudhary taught at Wardha until the later part of 1920. During this time, he met Gandhi multiple times during Congress party's conventions in Nagpur, Calcutta, and Ahmedabad. Through these meetings, Chaudhary not only grew closer to Gandhi and his ethics but also imbibed his values of austerity and simple living in his personal life. Chaudhary renounced family wealth and his wife, Anjana Devi, abandoned the wearing of jewellery.

=== Fighting princely feudalism: Rajasthan Seva Sangh and Bijolia satyagraha ===
Chaudhary and like-minded civic workers such as Pathik, Shobhalal Gupt, Maniklal Verma, Haribhai Kinker, Bhanvarlal started Rajasthan Seva Sangh at the time of Congress party's Nagpur convention in December 1920. It was modelled on the lines of Servants of India Society established by Gopal Krishna Gokhale. Anjana Devi was the sole woman founding member of this group intended to advance the causes of poor farmers, landless labourers, and bonded slaves in Rajputana's princely states. She was pivotal in organizing women from marginalized backgrounds against the feudal taxation regime.

Chaudhary and Anjana Devi gave up their ancestral belongings, including numerous grand properties, settling for a monthly wage of fourteen rupees to be a part of the Rajasthan Seva Sangh. In 1921, this organisation took over the leadership of Bijolia Satyagraha—a movement started by Pathik in 1916 against exploitative taxes imposed on farmers and labourers by feudal lords in the Bijolia region. Among the people it worked for, the group promoted wearing khadi, Hindu-Muslim harmony, removal of untouchability, and skill-based education.

In 1921, Rajasthan Seva Sangh established the newspaper Rajasthan Kesari in Wardha with the financial assistance of Jamnalal Bajaj. Chaudhary served as the publisher and assistant editor of this newspaper. A few months after its start, a news item vocally opposing the British administration in Rajasthan Kesari resulted in the imprisonment of Chaudhary and its co-editor, Satyadev Vidyalankar. During his first term in jail, Chaudhary spent around three months behind bars. However, they were treated with respect and let off a few weeks before their term's end to attend the Congress party's Ahmedabad convention in December 1921.

After this convention, Rajasthan Seva Sangh's headquarter was shifted to Ajmer from Wardha. Consequently, Chaudhary also shifted to Ajmer and he also started a weekly, Naveen Rajasthan, later renamed to Tarun Rajasthan. In 1922, as this weekly published a revolutionary writing advocating to topple the British administration, Chaudhary was jailed again for three months and barred from entering Jaipur state for 15 years.

By 1921–22, Bijolia satyagraha's expanse had grown: for instance, Mewar princely state abolished 84 oppressive taxes imposed on cultivators and labourers. Chaudhary soon began to spread information about the group and Bijolia satyagraha as a local correspondent sending news dispatches to several newspapers, viz. Aaj, Amrut Bazar Patrika, Bombay Chronicle, and Hindustan Times. The British feared the spread of the movement in other princely states of the region and increased the policing powers of some of the Rajputana states to clamp down on the protestors. In 1923, Chaudhary was arrested, without a warrant, and made to walk in chains for over three miles. He was assigned menial tasks such as collecting firewood for cooking. Charged with sedition, he served 15 months in Udaipur jail.

Chaudhary's salient work with the Rajasthan Seva Sangh continued for a long time as its activities kept on growing in Rajputana princely states. For instance, in 1925–26, Chaudhary sided with Sikar-based farmers in their protests to abolish exploitative taxes. He was again sent to jail for six months for doing so.

In 1928, Chaudhary left the group and his duties were handed over to Maniklal Kothari, Jay Narayan Vyas, and Rishidutt Mehta.

=== With Gandhi: from Sabarmati and Sevagram Ashram to India's Independence ===
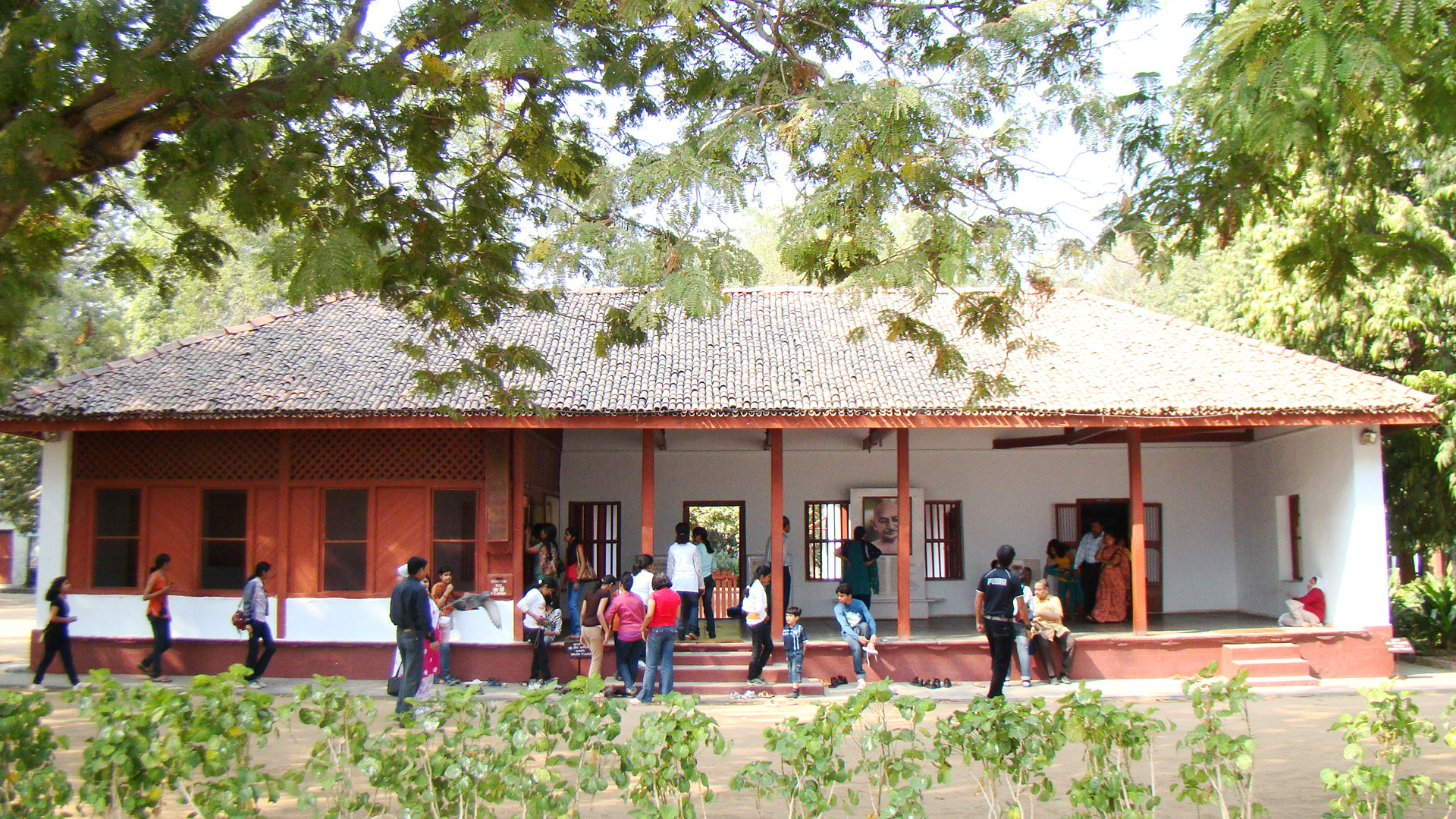
Ram Narayan Chaudhary resided multiple times, with his family, at Ahmedabad's Sabarmati Ashram (image courtesy: Wikimedia Commons)

In 1928–29, after Chaudhary was briefly engaged with the Rajputana Praja Parishad (Rajputana People's Conference), he started an English weekly titled Young Rajasthan with Shobhalal Gupt from Beawar near Ajmer. Soon, on the advice of Bajaj, he left Rajasthan to join Gandhi at Sabarmati Ashram in Ahmedabad.

Chaudhary considered his Ahmedabad stay nothing less than a pilgrimage. Gandhi assigned him responsibilities of constructive programmes in Kathiawar agency states. After finishing this work, Chaudhary suggested to Gandhi to undertake similar activities in the rest of India's princely states. Both of them put together a statement of objective for what was named the Princes & People's Service Society - though the society could not eventually take shape.

On Gandhi's advice to involve himself in constructive programmes, Chaudhary shut down the weekly Young Rajasthan. Gandhi personally edited Young Rajasthan's farewell article during Congress party's Lahore convention published on 26 December 1929.

At the ashram, he took up duties such as administrative work, cleaning the campus, teaching Hindi to women and children while learning the art of weaving during his five-month-long stay. His stay coincided with the historic Salt March's time. Gandhi, in his absence during Salt March, decided to hand over editorial responsibilities of his newspaper Young India to Chaudhary, though, the latter felt he was not suitable for this duty. Gandhi entrusted Chaudhary with important administrative responsibilities at the ashram and did not include him in the list of protestors who marched to Dandi.

Chaudhary reached Dandi just before the momentous event took place on 5 April 1930. Gandhi instructed him to reach Rajasthan to spread the message of Dandi March. Accordingly, Chaudhary made a few speeches in Ajmer region after which he was arrested and sent to Ajmer jail. He was released after the signing of Gandhi-Irwin pact in March 1931.

In the 1930s, Gandhi most crucially worked for the uplift of Harijans - a term that he popularised for scheduled castes or ex-untouchables. Chaudhary was hand in hand with Gandhi in this task. For instance, when in 1932, Gandhi, with the help of Amritlal Thakkar, started Harijan Sevak Sangh (Harijan Service Society), Chaudhary headed the organisation's activities in Rajputana region where feudal and casteist norms prevailed on a great scale. Chaudhary also joined Gandhi in his nation-wide tour to remove untouchability and took care of the Gandhi's correspondences.

Later, he returned to Ajmer from southern India and along with brother Durgaprasad and associates, viz. Shobhalal Gupt, Chandrabhan Sharma, and Maniklal Verma, set up an ashram in Nareli near Ajmer for the training of civil activists under the banner of Rajasthan Sevak Mandal (Rajasthan Service Society) in 1935. He was the chairperson of this group while Shobhalal Gupt served as its secretary. They also established an ashram in Dungarpur state's Sagwara to promote education, agricultural skills, and cleanliness among Bhils.

In 1935–36, as Chaudhary began to suffer from a heart ailment, Gandhi invited him to his ashram at Wardha to personally take care of his health. He stayed with Gandhi's secretary, Mahadev Desai, and took his daily lunch with Gandhi.

A drought affected large parts of Rajputana region exacerbating the conditions of poor farmers and labourers in 1936. At this point, Gandhi suggested to Chaudhary to return to Rajputana states to help Bhils. Chaudhary did vital social work through Rajasthan Sevak Mandal and created/recharged over 500 wells among Bhil-dominated villages. In 1936, this organisation launched Navjyoti weekly based in Ajmer.

In 1939, Chaudhary returned to Wardha with his Anjana Devi and their three children, namely, Pratap, Sita, and Subhadra. He handed over the editorial and publishing duties of Navjyoti to his brother Durgaprasad (who later established the newspaper as an important daily of Rajasthan). At Wardha, Gandhi entrusted Chaudhary with his personal correspondence. An avid reader and writer, he translated the weekly Harijan, and handled the library and reading room during this time. He also taught Hindi to Mirabehn and Rajkumari Amrit Kaur, who later served as independent India's first Health Minister. Anjana Devi was considered one of the most efficient cotton spinners on charkha at Wardha ashram.

In late 1941, Gandhi asked Chaudhary to run Gauseva Sangh at Wardha. Chaudhary undertook extensive training in dairy sciences at Imperial Dairy Institute in Bangalore. On his return from Bangalore to Wardha in August 1942, Chaudhary learned that an arrest warrant had been issued against him in Merwada state in the wake of the Quit India movement. He thought it appropriate to reach Ajmer with his family and surrender to the police. He was sent to Ajmer Central jail for over two years, along with his brother Durgaprasad and Swami Kumaranand.

In Chaudhary's absence, his wife, Anjana Devi continued the publication of the Navjyoti weekly based in Ajmer. Chaudhary was released in the last week of May 1945, a few months after the release of Gandhi and Jawaharlal Nehru.

In 1945, Navajivan Trust, a publishing house set-up by Gandhi in Ahmedabad, entrusted Chaudhary with translation of a number of Gandhi's writings given Chaudhary's lingual abilities in not just Hindi and English but also Urdu, Persian and Sanskrit. Therefore, Chaudhary shifted to Sabarmati Ashram in Ahmedabad with his family.

In 1946, Chaudhary established a daily titled Naya Rajasthan dedicated to Gandhian principles and ideas. He left Ahmedabad, along with his family, to settle in Ajmer and run the Naya Rajasthan newspaper.

== Public intellectual and social worker (1947–1965) ==
Post India's independence and Gandhi's assassination, Chaudhary continued with social work, writing, and translation based in Ajmer. He translated Gandhi's key writings, apart from canonical Gandhian texts by Kaka Kalelkar, Mahadev Desai, Manu Gandhi, among others.

In the early 1950s, a set of Congressmen left the party to form the Praja Socialist Party led by Ram Manohar Lohia due to ideological differences with Congress party. Chaudhary, who was also disillusioned with orthodox elements in Congress' Rajasthan unit, joined this new political party in 1950. He was persuaded by Congress party to rejoin them sometime before the 1952 General Election. He served as Congress Rajasthan's vice-president, yet internal factionalism disoriented Chaudhary further away from electoral politics.

At this point, Jawaharlal Nehru, India's first Prime Minister, proposed to him to serve as information secretary in Bharat Sevak Sangh, a national development agency set up by Planning Commission of India to aid government's development plans which was headed by Gulzarilal Nanda. Accordingly, in 1955, Chaudhary shifted to Delhi to work for this organisation to contribute to constructive programmes besides heading its correspondence and awareness building about the organisation. He remained Bharat Sevak Sangh's important functionary until 1960.

Circa 1960, Chaudhary formed Gram Sahyog Samaj (Village Cooperation Society) in a present-day Faridabad. Its initial activities focused on Punjab and Haryana, where it worked on removing social evils and discriminatory traditions, and on improving employment opportunities for the migrant poor. The society also established a college in Faridabad's Ajronda village and trained over 5,000 bureaucrats and sarpanchs in Punjab. This college named after Nehru exists to date.

During his decade-long time in Delhi, Chaudhary grew close to Nehru. From 1958 to 1960, Chaudhary conducted nineteen comprehensive interviews of Nehru which were compiled and published titled as Nehru - In His Own Words (1964).

While in Delhi, Chaudhary aided Indian government's talks as the government's chief interlocutor and mediator with Shiromani Akali Dal's leader Master Tara Singh regarding the latter's demand to create a separate state of Punjabi speakers for the Sikh community.

== Later life (1965–1989) ==
As he grew older, Chaudhary shifted to Ajmer in 1965. He operated out of a simple two-room house, half of which served as the office of Gram Sahyog Samaj. He was associated with several organisations devoted to constructive programmes. For example, from 1965 until 1978, he worked with Ajmer Nagrik Sangh (Ajmer Citizens Society), Rajasthan Lok Sevak Sangh (Rajasthan People's Service Society), and Swatantra Senik Sangh (Freedom Fighters' Society).

In the early 1970s, as attacks on civil liberty mounted in India, he became a pessimist with regards to India's future. In 1975, Prime Minister Indira Gandhi imposed a national emergency, a controversial period in India's history. In response, Chaudhary wrote a detailed, strongly worded letter to Indira Gandhi pleading for an immediate removal of national emergency.

In this phase of his life, though Chaudhary had begun to increasingly retreat from active public life, he remained physically until his last days as he believed in shramdaan (voluntary physical labour). He spent two hours every day doing physical labour, especially by maintaining a garden in his house's compound.

Chaudhary died in Ajmer on 4 April 1989 at the age of 94.

== Personal life ==
Ram Narayan Chaudhary married Anjana Devi in 1911. Anjana Devi came from a wealthy family based in Srimadhopur, Chaudhary's mother's native town. Her father, Baldevram, was a trader and served as a member of Srimadhopur's panch. Chaudhary personally taught languages to Anjana Devi at a time when educating women was considered a social taboo, especially in Rajasthan. Anjana Devi joined Chaudhary's fray of freedom fighters and gave up wearing jewellery after the couple co-founded Rajasthan Sevak Sangh in 1920. For her contribution in mobilising women during the Bijolia Satyagraha, she not only spent multiple jail terms but was also threatened to be killed at gunpoint by a police officer in Mewar's Amargadh. In 1932, she was jailed twice in the wake of the violation of Gandhi-Irwin pact by British administrators.

The couple had three children. In 1927, Anjana Devi gave birth to their first child and only son, Pratap. After that, in three years, she gave birth to two daughters, Sita and Subhadra, respectively. As Chaudhary spent almost six years serving various prison terms, Anjana Devi had a special role in providing a sound upbringing of their three children, often taking personal advice from Gandhi.

Anjana Devi died on 27 April 1981 to cancer at the age of 83. In her memory, Chaudhary set up Anjana Devi Smarak Trust in Ajmer and wrote her biography in 1986.

Chaudhary, through his will written in 1972, instructed family members to use his personal savings to set up Rajasthan Trimurti Smarak Trust, an organisation wished to establish in the memory of his three mentors, i.e. Arjunlal Sethi, Thakur Kesarisinh Barhath, and Vijaysinh Pathik.

=== Personal beliefs ===
As a staunch Gandhian, Chaudhary believed in non-violence resistance, promotion of Hindu-Muslim harmony, removal of untouchability, women's education, and voluntary physical labour. Throughout his life, he undertook constructive programmes to implement these Gandhian ideals.

Chaudhary imbibed Gandhi's vision in his personal life by living a life of simplicity. He and Anjana Devi gave up jewellery and other luxuries in the first decade of their married life and spent much of their life without much income. Like Gandhi, Chaudhary followed a diet of boiled, spice-free food. Chaudhary did not believe in the ritualistic aspect of religion.

He refused political positions to observe Gandhi's ethic of maintaining a distance from lucrative offices of power. For instance, Chaudhary was offered the ambassadorship to Iran by the Nehru government in 1952-53 through their mutual friend, Rafi Ahmed Kidwai. A few years later, Nehru offered to make him a minister in his government. After the 1977 general election which brought Janata Party to power, he was offered the governorship of Rajasthan. He declined all of these offers.

== Writings ==
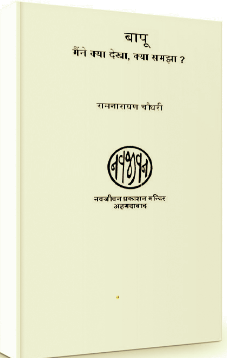
Ram Narayan Chaudhary's book titled, Bapu: Meine Kya Dekha, Kya Samjha?, published by Navajivan Prakashan (1954)

Chaudhary was a prolific writer, translator, publisher, and editor for his entire career. He published and edited, at various points of his life, Hindi newspapers such as Rajasthan Kesari, Tarun Rajasthan, Naveen Rajasthan, Navjyoti weekly and Naya Rajasthan as a way to mobilize the masses during Indian independence movement. In 1929, he established and briefly operated the English newspaper, Young Rajasthan.

Chaudhary wrote over 10 books in Hindi including a history of Rajasthan, experiences with Mahatma Gandhi and Jawaharlal Nehru, his wife Anjana Devi, and his thoughts on the future of Rajasthan. Some of his prominent books include Bapu: Meine Kya Dekha, Kya Samjha? (1954, Bapu as I saw him), an authorized and first-of-its kind history of Rajasthan state titled Beesvi Sadi ka Rajasthan (1980, 20th Century Rajasthan), Vartmaan Rajasthan (1948, Present Rajasthan), among others.

His popular English books include Bapu as I saw him (1959, originally in Hindi), and a compilation of his interviews with Jawaharlal Nehru published in Nehru - In His Own Words (1964). Later, these two books were translated into Gujarati by Navajivan Trust and published as Bapu - Mari Najare and Panditji - Potani Vishe.

In English, Chaudhary published his ideas on social work from his personal experience in a book titled Reflections of a Social Worker (1962).

As a translator of Gandhi's writings and important Gandhian activists, Chaudhary translated over five dozen books. These works included Gandhi's prison experiences at Yerwada jail, views on public education, ideas about state-society relations, caste system, natural remedies for diseases, and correspondence with Vallabhbhai Patel, ashram residents, et al. Chaudhary translated key Gandhian literary works, for example, Gandhi's secretary, Mahadev Desai's diaries. He also translated writings of other Gandhian social reformers such as Kaka Kalelkar, Shankarlal Banker, Manu Gandhi, Mirabehn, Pyarelal, among others.

== See also ==
- Bijolia Satyagraha
- Vijay Sinh Pathik
- Arjun Lal Sethi
- Wardha Ashram
- List of Indian freedom fighters
