= Ram Pande =

Indian historian and civil servant (1945–2019)

- Born: September 1945; Bhusawar, Bharatpur, Rajasthan
- Died: 17 September 2019
- Occupations: Historian and Civil Servant

Academic background
- Education: Doctor of Philosophy
- Alma mater: University of Cambridge (Master's); University of Rajasthan (Ph.D.)
- Thesis: A Social and Political History of the State of Bharatpur upto 1826 (Ph.D.)
- Doctoral advisor: Arthur Llewellyn Basham

Academic work
- Discipline: History
- Institutions: Former director of Shodhak; Former 'Senior Research Officer' at the Department of Labour, Government of Rajasthan

Ram Pande (September 1945 – 17 September 2019) was an Indian historian and civil servant.

== Biography ==
Pande was born at Bhusawar in Rajasthan's Bharatpur district in September 1945. He did his master's degree from the University of Cambridge in the UK and his Ph.D. from the University of Rajasthan in India. The doctoral supervisor for his Ph.D. was Arthur Llewellyn Basham, and the subject of his doctoral thesis was "A Social and Political History of the State of Bharatpur upto 1826". He pursued his D.Litt with "The History of Mauritius" as the subject of research. He spoke multiple languages including French, Marathi, Persian, and Rajasthani languages. Between 1967 and 1974, Pande taught at the Meerut University in Uttar Pradesh and at several colleges in Rajasthan. From 1975 to 1997, he had worked as a "senior civil servant" for the government of Rajasthan. He had served as the "senior research officer" at the Rajasthani government's Department of Labour. Pande died on 17 September 2019 at the age of nearly 74 years.

== Research ==
Pande was a member of the Indian History Congress Association, the Indian History Commission, and the Indian Planning Commission's Technical Advisory Committee.

Pande was of the view that Mewar State's Bijolia movement of 1897 was Rajasthan's first agrarian movement. He shed light on Rajasthan Seva Sangh's role in mobilizing the peasants against the oppression of landlords in the Bijolia movement. He provided a study of the origin of the peasants' struggle against the authorities and landlords. He identified the "excessive taxation", "maladministration", "rapacity of the officials", and the "atrocities committed by the Jagirdars" on the peasants in Alwar, Bikaner, Marwar, and Shekhawati as the root causes for the "agrarian unrest" in those areas of Rajasthan. He inquired into the Bhils' struggle against the British government and Udaipur State's Maharana, the roots of which he traced back to 1823, and pointed out the "census work" which was done in 1881 as one of the reasons for the "dissatisfaction among the Bhils". According to Pande, the Rajasthan Seva Sangh and the Vanvasi Seva Sangh supplemented their struggle from 1920 to 1946.

Hastinapur College's Jagdish C. Joshi noted that Pande described the Champaran Satyagraha as a successor movement to the Bijolia movement; stated that the leaders of the peasant uprisings were not peasants themselves but "external" people with "political motives"; and stressed that the movements' goal was not fighting and overthrowing the feudal system but to "get redress of some of their grievances". According to Joshi, Pande did not provide evidence that Mahatma Gandhi "took cue from it [Bijolia movement]" and did not point out "to what extent leadership was able to impart to the [peasant] movements a political ideology". According to Horatio Freeman and Allen Isaacmen, Pande showed that in the satyagraha, Gandhi used the same "tactics" which the peasants used in Rajasthan's agrarian movements which predated his satyagraha. Freeman and Isaacmen noted that he depicted Rajasthan's peasant movement as "conservative in its goals, operating within the framework of a peasant moral economy based upon a feudal system of land tenure". Joshi concurred with Pande's analysis that majority of the peasants were not part of the movements but noticed that he did not sift through the reasons for the absence of other peasants in the movements. Joshi considered Pande's analysis that "in India, specially in Rajasthan, [peasants] have a faith in democratic socialism which is quite different from Russia or Chinese socialism"; that "India is a traditionally democratic country"; and that "the Rajasthan peasant was not a serf of European type" as assertions.

== Works ==
In total, Pande authored 11 books, 107 research articles, and edited over 30 books.

=== Books ===
- Pande, Ram (1980). Appraisal of Land Reforms in Rajasthan. Jaipur, India: Shodhak. OCLC 253849280.
- Pande, Ram (1974). Agrarian Movement in Rajasthan. Delhi, India: University Publishers. OCLC 2121233.
- Pande, Ram (1970). Bharatpur upto 1826: A Social and Political History of the Jats. Jaipur, India: Rama. OCLC 131923.

=== Books edited ===
- Pande, Ram, ed. (1985). Congress 100 Years (Papers Presented at the Seminar on "Congress Hundred Years" Held in Jaipur, in 1984). Jaipur, India: Jaipur Pub. House. LCCN 85901925. OCLC 572887801.
- Pande, Ram, ed. (1983). Land Reforms and Social Change (Papers Presented at the Seminar on 'Land Reforms and Social Change in Rajasthan' at Jaipur on 29–30th September 1983). Jaipur, India: Jaipur Pub. House. LCCN 84900006. OCLC 12106077.

=== Selected papers ===
- Pande, Ram (1979). "Position of Women in Jaipur (A Note Regarding Modern Period)". In Asopa, Jai Narayan (ed.). Cultural Heritage of Jaipur. Jaipur, Rajasthan: Rajasthan History Congress. pp. 76–81. LCCN 81903228. OCLC 644098719.
- Pande, Ram (1973). Chandra, Satish; De, Barun; Grover, B. R.; Chattopadhyaya, B. D.; et al. (eds.). "Treaty Between Akbar and Surjan Rao Hara of Bundi – Re-examined". Proceedings of the Indian History Congress. 34 (Part I). Indian History Congress: 205. JSTOR 44138623.
- Pande, Ram (1969). Jaiswal, Suvira; Ahmad, Qeyamuddin; Shukla, R. L. (eds.). "Fall of Bharatpur". Proceedings of the Indian History Congress. 31. Indian History Congress: 368. JSTOR 44138398.
- Pande, Ram (1969). Jaiswal, Suvira; Ahmad, Qeyamuddin; Shukla, R. L. (eds.). "Relations Between the Jats and Rajputs". Proceedings of the Indian History Congress. 31. Indian History Congress: 214. JSTOR 44138365.
- Pande, Ram (1967). Chaudhary, R. K.; Habib, Irfan Mohammed; De, Barun (eds.). "Raja Bishan Singh's Campaign Against the Jats (1688–1693)". Proceedings of the Indian History Congress. 29 (Part I). Indian History Congress: 173–176. JSTOR 44155493.
