= Nagavanshi =

Indian dynasty

Nagavanshi (IAST: Nāgavaṃśī) refers to several Indian Kshatriya dynasties or ruling groups claiming descent from the mythical Nāgas. Along with Suryavanshi, Agnivanshi and Chandravanshi, the Nagavanshi clans form a part of the Kshatriya class in the Varna system of India. The notable members of this class include:

- Nairs, who ruled in Kerala
- Nagas of Chotanagpur, who ruled in Chota Nagpur, Jharkhand
- Nagas of Padmavati, who ruled in Madhya Pradesh
- Nagas of Vidisha, who ruled in Madhya Pradesh
- Nagas of Vindhyatabi, ancient dynasty of Odisha
- Bhanja Khandayats, who ruled in Odisha.
- Nagas of Panna State, who ruled in Madhya Pradesh
- Nagas of Kalahandi, who ruled in Kalahandi, Odisha
- Chindaka Naga, who ruled in Chhattisgarh and Odisha
- Pithipatis of Magadha, medieval Buddhist dynasty formed in Magadha by a branch of the Chindaka Nagas
- Alupas (part of the Bunt community), ancient dynasty of Karnataka
- Bunts (Shetty and Chowtas), who ruled in Karnataka
