= Sadhu Sitaram Das =

Indian revolutionary

- Born: 1883; Bijolia, Bhilwara, Rajasthan
- Occupations: Revolutionary, Ayurvedic Medicine Practicer

Sadhu Sitaram Das was Indian revolutionary. He was the first who led peasants in Bijolia movement.

== Early life ==
He was born in Bairagi (Sadhu Vairagi) family in 1883 in Bijolia. He completed his primary education in Bijolia then he went to Banaras for higher education. He started a Mitra Mandal (Friends' Association) in Bijolia in 1905, and through this spread word about the Nationalist Movement in British India. Sitaram Das closed it in 1907 when he took up a position with the Rav (chieftain of Bijolia) but resigned this post in 1908 due to disagreements. He then practised Ayurvedic medicine, which brought him into contact with the peasants whom he treated. From them, Sitaramdas learnt of the oppression they suffered, and he began visiting the villages to get further information about their plight. And Sitaram das dedicated his whole life for raising voice of poor farmers against their exploitation.

== Bijolia Movement and Sadhu Sitaram Das ==
Bijolia, was part of Mewar prior to Independence. During the freedom struggle, the peasant movement in the town narrated a tale of the power of the common man. The movement started in 1897, led by Sadhu Sitaram Das. Sadhu Sitaram Das tried to raise voice farmers in the royal court of Mewar. On the basis of leadership, Bijolia movement can be classified into three phases. The first phase (1897-1914) was led by Sadhu Sitaram Das. In March 1913 nearly 1000 peasants under the leadership of Sadhu Sitaram Das presented their grievances to the jagirdar and when he refused to see the peasants, then the peasants decided not to cultivate the lands in Bijolia and the lands were left fallow in the years 1913-1914. In 1915 he met Vijay Singh Pathik and he was impressed by Vijay Singh Pathik in first meeting. Sadhu Sitaram Das asked Vijay Singh Pathik to lead peasants movement of Bijolia. In 1915, Sitaram Das gave responsibility of leading peasants to Vijay Singh Pathik. Due to this, next phase (1916–23) of Bijolia movement was led by Vijay Singh Pathik.
