= Begun farmer's movement =

The Begun farmer's movement (in Hindi and Rajasthani:बेगून किसान आंदोलन) was one of the farmer's movements of Rajasthan during British Raj in India. Begun is a village in Chittorgarh district. It was a movement of peasants against high taxes by then Mewar government.

This movement was started from Menal in 1921 where farmers gathered and decided for struggle against government for demand of implementing taxation system fair and reasonable. Vijay Singh Pathik gave leadership of this movement to Ramnarayan Chaudhary. The farmers decided not to pay Lags and Begars (Taxes and labour work) as well as to boycott courts and government offices. In reaction the government launched an operation of crushing the movement. After two years an agreement was made between Rajasthan Sewa Sangh (a farmer's union) and Rawat Sawai anup singh ji but it was opposed by government naming it a "Bolshevik agreement" and the government appointed a government employee in the place of Thikanedar under its 'Munsarmat policy'. Government sent the Trench commission for the inquiry of demands of the Bengun movement. Mr. Trench, head of the commission justified almost all taxes except small taxes. Later on 13 July 1923, Mr. Trench opened fire after lathicharge on a non-violent assembly of farmers. Two farmers, Rupaji and Kripaji, were killed. They are remembered as martyrs of Begun in the history of Rajasthan.

Later leadership of this movement was handed over to Vijay Singh Pathik. As a result of movement the endowment system of taxes was adopted in place of dictatorship-like system. Taxes rates were made fixed and many taxes were taken back by the government. Begar Pratha (bonded labour system) was abolished.
