= Bhomat =

Mountainous and forested area in southern Rajasthan, India

- Bhumat (Hindi: भोमट or भूमट)
- Floor elevation: 800 ft (240 m)
- Length: 94 km (58 mi)
- Width: 56 km (35 mi)
- Area: 1,233 km^{2} (476 mi^{2})

Geology
- Type: Quartzite, Phyllite, Gneisses, Schist, Dolomitic marble

Geography
- Location: Rajasthan, India
- Borders on: Girwa and Kherwara tehsils of Udaipur district (east), Gogunda tehsil of Udaipur district (north), Sirohi district (west), Gujarat (south)
- Coordinates: 24°26′N 73°18′E
- Traversed by: NH 76
- Rivers: Sabarmati River, Wakal River, Som River
- Interactive map of Bhomat

Bhomat (also referred to as Bhumat; Hindi: भोमट or भूमट) is a mountainous and forested area in southern Rajasthan, covering all or parts of the tehsils of Kotra, Jhadol and Kherwara in Udaipur district. During British rule, the region was also referred to as 'Hilly Tracts of Mewar'.

== Name ==
The name 'Bhomat' is based on the understanding that land tenures known as bhum were held by jagirdars in the region. But as per details provided by Mewar State, Govt. of India accepted that the Rajputs who held villages in Bhomat were not Bhumias, but Jagirdars.

== Geography ==
The Bhomat region is 25 to 50 kilometres (20 to 30 mi) wide in the east-west direction and stretches approximately 94 kilometres (58 mi) in the north-south axis. It covers approximately 1,233 square kilometres (476 mi^{2}).Geographically, Bhomat is divided in three sub-regions: its western area is called Bhader (Hindi: भाडेर), the central area is called Wakal (after the Wakal River; Hindi: वाकल) and the eastern area is called Khadak (Hindi: खड़क). Primary rivers of the Bhomat are Sabarmati, Vakal, and Som.

== History ==
In the 15th century, Rana Kumbha is credited with building fortresses in the Bhomat region with the goal of containing revolts among the Bhils of the area. In the 16th century, the Bhomat region was the shelter for the Ranas of Mewar when times of military crises caused by the Mughals. Rajput Jagirdars had recognised suzerainty of the Maharana of Maewar and were paying cash tribute in form of dasoond and provided armed contingents of their quota at disposal of the Mewar State.

The Bhomat is recognised as a geographical or cultural region, but it was a unified political entity for only a short term - a century - under British paramountcy. Prior to accession of the Mewar State to the Republic of India in 1949, the region was ruled by several Rajput jagirdars, the important ones being: Jawas, Pahara, Madri, Thana, Chhani, Juda, Panarwa, Oghna, Umariya, Patia, Bawalwara, Barothi, Sarwan, and Nainbara. These Jagirdars were known as bhumias (i.e., ones holding a bhum land tenure) and owed only nominal allegiance to the Mewar State. For approximately a century during British paramountcy over Mewar State, the Bhomat represented a political unit divided in two sub-divisions - Kherwara Bhomat to the east and Kotra Bhomat to the east.

== Rajput Jagirdars of Bhomat region ==
Rajput Jagirdars of Bhomat
Thikana	Clan	Title	Chatoond	Judicial Powers
Jawas	Chauhan	Rawat	2300	First Class
Pahara	Chauhan	Rawat	706	Second Class
Barothi	Chauhan	Thakur	201	First Class
Madari	Sarangdevot Sisodiya	Rawat	301	Third Class
Thana	Chauhan	Thakur	223	Third Class
Channi	Chauhan	Thakur	500	Third Class
Juda	Chauhan	Rawat	600	First Class
Panarwa	Solanki	Rana	500	Second Class
Oghna	Solanki	Rawat	400	Second Class
Umariya	Solanki	Thakur	150	Second Class
Patia	Panwar	Thakur	201	--

== Population ==
Adivasis comprise the majority of the population in the Bhomat.
