= Motilal Tejawat =

Indian activist (1885-1963)

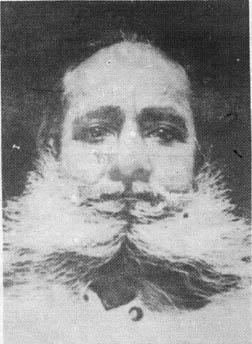
- Motilal Tejawat, leader of the Eki Movement
- Born: 1885; Koliyari, Mewar State
- Died: 1963 (aged 77–78)
- Occupations: Activist, social reformer
- Organization: Eki Movement
- Known for: Leadership of the Eki Movement
- Notable work: Mobilization of Bhil peasants and tribals in Rajasthan and Gujarat
- Movement: Tribal rights movement

Motilal Tejawat (1885–1963) was the leader of the Eki Movement that was agitated in the 1920s in the adivasi-dominated border areas of present-day Rajasthan and Gujarat.

== Early life ==
Motilal Tejawat was born in Koliyari (now in Jhadol tehsil, Udaipur district, Rajasthan) in 1886. After being educated to the fifth grade, he was employed in the Jhadol thikana (in present-day Jhadol tehsil) for some time. During his stint at Jhadol, he witnessed the oppressive behavior of the thakur and his henchmen towards the local Bhil people, which prompted him to resign his position in 1920. He then worked for a shopkeeper in Udaipur city.

Soon after obtaining new employment, Tejawat was sent by his employer to Jhadol on business, where the thakur ordered him to hand over building material belonging to Tejawat's employer; he refused to oblige, and was beaten up and imprisoned by the thakur until Tejawat's employer was able to arrange for his release. Following this experience, Tejawat gave up his job in Udaipur and devoted himself to full-time political activity.

== Activism ==
Motilal Tejawat's immediate source of inspiration was the Bijolia movement. Tejawat came in contact with pamphlets originating from the Bijolia Movement and proceeded to make copies of and distribute the pamphlets in Bhil-majority areas. Tejawat organized several meetings in Bhil villages in the erstwhile estate of Jhadol, which resulted in the formation of a committee that sought to articulate the grievances and demands of the Bhil peasantry.

Tejawat saw his movement as being part of the larger independence movement in India led by, among others, Gandhi. He is said to have stated during speeches that once 'Gandhi raj' was established, the agitators would have to pay only one anna in the rupee (i.e., 6%) to their rulers.

=== Eki Movement ===
See Eki Movement.

==== Position of national leaders ====
Gandhi did not approve of Tejawat's methods and distanced himself from Tejawat in an article in Young India:

I hear that a gentleman by name Motilal Pancholi hailing from Udaipur claims to be my disciple and to preach temperance and what not among the rustics of the Rajputana States. He is reported to be surrounded by an armed crowd of admirers and establishing his kingdom or some other -dom wherever he goes. He claims too, miraculous powers. He or his admirers are reported to have done some destructive work. I wish that people will once and for all understand that I have no disciples.

Similarly, V.S. Pathik criticized Tejawat:

One thing, however, is certain and that is that it was beyond Moti Lal's intellectual capacity to lead the public on the right path...nobody, even a child, would ever recognize Moti Lal as having a political aim or status, nor was he connected with any political society.

==== Tejawat's arrest and imprisonment ====
Tejawat had been outlawed by the Udaipur state, which had announced a Rs-500 reward on his head.

Tejawat was arrested in Khedbrahma on June 4, 1929, by police belonging to Idar State, and handed over the Mewar State. Tejawat was held in Udaipur, without trial, until his release on April 23, 1939.

=== Post-Eki Movement activities ===
In December 1939, Tejawat announced to the Agra newspaper Sainik his intention to proceed to the adivasi areas of Mewar; he was barred by state authorities from doing so. However, in spite of state opposition to his activities, Tejawat continued to tour adivasi areas to advocate social reform, and was arrested again in Kotra on January 24,1946.
