= Arjun Sethi =

Arjun Sethi may refer to:

- Pandit Arjun Lal Sethi (born 1880), revolutionary, politician and educator
- Arjun Charan Sethi (born 1941), Indian politician and presently a member of the BJD political party
- Arjun Singh Sethi (born 1981), Indian American civil rights writer and lawyer
- Arjun Sethi (entrepreneur) (born 1983), American Internet entrepreneur, investor and executive
