= Naga king =

Naga king may refer to

- Nagaraja, a leader of the Nāga, half-human and half snake beings in Indian religion and mythology
- King of the dynasty of the Nagas of Padmavati in ancient India
