= Kashi Prasad Jayaswal Research Institute =

Research Institute in Patna

Kashi Prasad Jayaswal Research Institute is a research institute in Patna, Bihar and is headquartered at Patna Museum building. It works under the Education department of the Government of Bihar.

== History ==
It was established in October 1950 by the Government of Bihar. It was named after Kashi Prasad Jayaswal, an Indian Historian and lawyer. It is currently working under the Directorship of Kumari Lalita. It has published many books in Hindi and English language.

== Publications ==
- Studies in Indian History and Culture. Kashi Prasad Jayaswal Research Institute. 1987.
- Dīpakāra (1959). Abhidharmadīpa with Vibhāshāprabhā[v]ṛitti [Dīpakāra] (in Sanskrit). Kashi Prasad Jayaswal Research Institute.
- Narain, A. K. (1998). The Earliest Sakas of South Asia. Kashi Prasad Jayaswal Research Institute.
- Prasad, Rajiva Nain (1987). History of Bhojpur, 1320-1860 A.D. Kashi Prasad Jayaswal Research Institute.
- Choudhary, Indra Kumar (1988). Some Aspects of Social Life of Medieval Mithila, 1350-1750 A.D.: With a Special Reference to Contemporary Literatures. Kashi Prasad Jayaswal Research Institute.
- Caudharī, Vijaya Candra Prasāda (1980). Imperial Honeymoon with Indian Aristocracy. Kashi Prasad Jayaswal Research Institute.
- Thakur, Upendra (1986). Indian Missionaries in the Land of Gold. Kashi Prasad Jayaswal Research Institute.
- Hirakawa, Akira (1982). Mahāsāṃghika-bhikṣuṇī-vinaya. Kashi Prasad Jayaswal Research Institute.
- Ojha, P. N.; Institute, Kashi Prasad Jayaswal Research (1985). History of the Indian National Congress in Bihar, 1885-1985. Kashi Prasad Jayaswal Research Institute.
- Sinha, Bindeshwari Prasad (1974). Comprehensive History of Bihar: pt. 2 [1974]. Kashi Prasad Jayaswal Research Institute.
- Ahmad, Qeyamuddin (1973). Corpus of Arabic & Persian Inscriptions of Bihar (A.H. 640-1200). K. P. Jayaswal Research Institute.
- Jñānaśrīmitra (1959). Jñānaśrīmitranibandhāvalī : (Buddhist philosophical works of Jñānaśrīmitra) (in Sanskrit). Kashi Prasad Jayaswal Research Institute.
