= Narwar coinage =

Currency in India

The various Kings of the Nagas of Narwar issued coins of ¼, ½ and 1 kakini, from 5–15 mm in size and all issued in bronze. Designs were humped bull facing left, wheel peacock, trident and various other designs. The Nagas of Narwar occupied the region of Padmavati, Kantipuri, Mathura and Vidisha around the period of 200-340 AD. In this period there was substantial trade between India and Rome in spices, fabric and gold. Text used was in the Brahmi script of an early Prakrit language.
