= Grahapati Kokkala inscription =

Inscription from c. 1000 in central India

The Grahapati Kokkala inscription is an epigraphic record documenting the dedication of a Shiva temple. It dates to 1000-1001 CE. It is one of several Chandella era inscriptions that mention a Grahapati family.

It is the earliest known reference to a Grahapati family. Unlike all other Chandella era Grahapati inscriptions which are Jain, this refers to a Shiva temple, although Verse 3 suggests that the builder also worshipped Jinas.

== Location ==
It was found somewhere in Khajuraho or its vivicinity, and is currently located in the Vishvanath temple there.

== Publication ==
The inscription was first published by Cunningham, and has since been published in several books.

== Description and contents ==
The inscription at Khajuraho, dated Samvat 1056, Kartika (1000–1001 AD), is engraved on a slab and records the dedication of a temple termed Vidyanatha temple. The current location of the Vidyanatha temple is uncertain; the inscription slab has been fixed to the Vishvanath temple. Cunningham had identified the Beejamandal temple at Jatkara village near Khajuraho as the Vishvanath temple.

== Metrics ==
Most of the inscription is metrical, with the exception of the initial invocation to Shiva and the samvat at the end.

== Text ==
It is a large 22 line text. It starts with invocation Om Namah Shivaya.

- Verses 1-2: Invocation of Lord Shiva.
- Verse 3: Equates Shiva with Parama Brahma, Buddha, Vaman, Jina etc.
- Verses 5-7: Praise of the Padmavati city.
- Verses 8-14: Praises a family lineage of Grahapai Vamsha leading to Kokkala.
- Verses 15-21: Describe a town and the Vaidyanath temple built by Kokkala.

== Translation ==
Translations are provided by Kanhiayalal Agrawal and Kale

== See also ==
- Indian inscriptions
- Khajuraho
- Padmavati Pawaya
- Beejamandal
