= Mewar Bhil Corps =

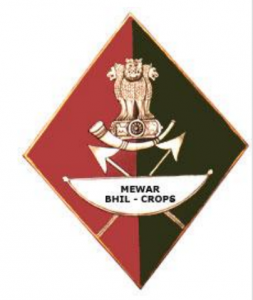
- Mewar Bhil Corps Insignia
- Active: 1841 – present
- Country: India
- Branch: Indian Army, Rajasthan Police
- Type: Local Corps
- Decorations: Unknown

The Mewar Bhil Corps is a state armed police force of the Rajasthan Police. The Corps was originally raised by the British Indian government as a military unit along similar lines as units such as the Merwara Battalion and Malwa Bhil Corps. The Corps operated as a semi-military formation until 1938; since then it has been maintained as a para-military force.

As of 2015, the sanctioned strength of the Corps was 773 personnel. It is organized along with the battalions of the Rajasthan Armed Constabulary under an Additional Director General of Police for Armed Battalions. The sole battalion of the MBC is deployed in Udaipur range.

== History ==
The Mewar Bhil Corps was established in 1841 under the command of Captain W. Hunter, with its headquarters at Kherwara. The reasons for raising the Corps were two-fold: (a) to provide employment to members of the Bhil tribe, thus ensuring their "good behavior" and (b) to police the "difficult hill country" of Mewar.

=== Organization ===
As of 1891, the Corps had five officers - Commandant, Assistant Commandant, Adjutant, Wing Officer, and Medical Officer (of which the 2nd in command was stationed in Kotra, the others in Kherwara). The Commandant was also entrusted with political charge of the Bhomat region, also known as the Mewar Hilly Tracts. This officer acted as First Assistant to the Mewar Political Agent. The Assistant Commandant of the Mewar Bhil Corps was located in Kotra and acted as the Second Assistant to the Mewar Political Agent.

Until the 1930s, regular military officers used to be appointed to the Corps; after that time, officers in the Indian Army Reserve were appointed because of the paucity of regular officers.

=== Size of the Corps ===
The initial strength of the Corps was 4 companies, which was increased to 10 companies in 1844, of which 3 companies were stationed in the village of Kotra (in present-day Kotra tehsil). In 1861, the Corps was reduced to 8 companies, 6 at Kherwara and 2 at Kotra. As of 1891, a detachment of the Corps was stationed in Udaipur as an escort to the Resident of Mewar. As of 1932, the strength of the Corps was 633 ranks.

=== Expenses ===
It was raised at a cost of Rs. 120,000 of which the Mewar State paid Rs. 50,000 and the remainder by the British Indian Government. In the early decades, the Mewar State contributed Rs. 50,000 annually for the upkeep of the Corps but, in 1883, it was arranged that instead of the payment, the British Government should take revenues from the villages in the Mewar portion of Mewara. As of 1932, the annual expense of the Corps was Rs. 2.29 lakhs.

=== Engagements ===
The Mewar Bhil Corps' primary function was to maintain the internal security in Mewar State, such as providing guards for residences at Mount Abu and Udaipur, and was never pressed into active service in a war. The following were the Corps' better known engagements in matters of internal security.

==== 1857 Rebellion ====
During the Indian Revolt of 1857, the Mewar Bhil Corps remained loyal to the British. One wing of the 1st Bengal Cavalry was stationed at Kherwara cantonment, which was a cause of concern to the British as the other wing of the cavalry in Nimach had revolted. Captains J.C. Brooke and R.M. Annesley who were the Commandant and second-in-command respectively, arranged for the Mewar Bhil Corps to shut the passes leading out of Kherwara and keep the Bengal Cavalry in check.

==== 1875 Bagore Rebellion ====
In a dispute about succession to the rulership of Mewar, the jagirdar of Bagore, Sohan Singh, claimed the right of accession instead of Sajjan Singh and openly rebelled against the Maharana. On 18 September 1875, 275 men of the Mewar Bhil Corps were dispatched along with the Maharana's troops to Bagore. Sohan Singh surrendered without a shot being fired.

=== Uniform ===
The uniform of the Mewar Bhil Corps in 1900 consisted of a dark green tunic and breeches plus khaki puttees. Facings on collar, shoulder straps and cuffs were red. The headdress was a round black cap with MBC in bronze metal lettering.

=== Transition ===
In 1950, Mewar Bhil Corps was transferred to the Rajasthan Police.
