= Pawāyā Gupta image inscription =

The Pawāyā image inscription is an epigraphic record documenting the dedication of a Vaiṣṇava image. It dates to the circa fifth century CE.

== Location ==
Padmavati (Padmavati Pawaya) was a large city-site located in Gwalior District, Madhya Pradesh, India. The current location of the inscription is not recorded.

== Publication ==
The inscription was first published by M. B. Garde in 1914-15. It was subsequently listed by H. N. DvivedI and M. Willis.

== Description and Contents ==
The inscription is engraved on the pedestal of an image and records the dedication.

== Metrics ==
The record is not metrical.

== Text ==
Garde suggested the reading: namo bhagvate vi [-]m [pra]tima sthāpita bhagava(to).

== Translation ==
Salutation to Vishnu, having installed the image.

== See also ==
- Indian inscriptions
- Padmavati Pawaya
