= Beejamandal =

Coordinates: 24.829348°N 79.934410°E

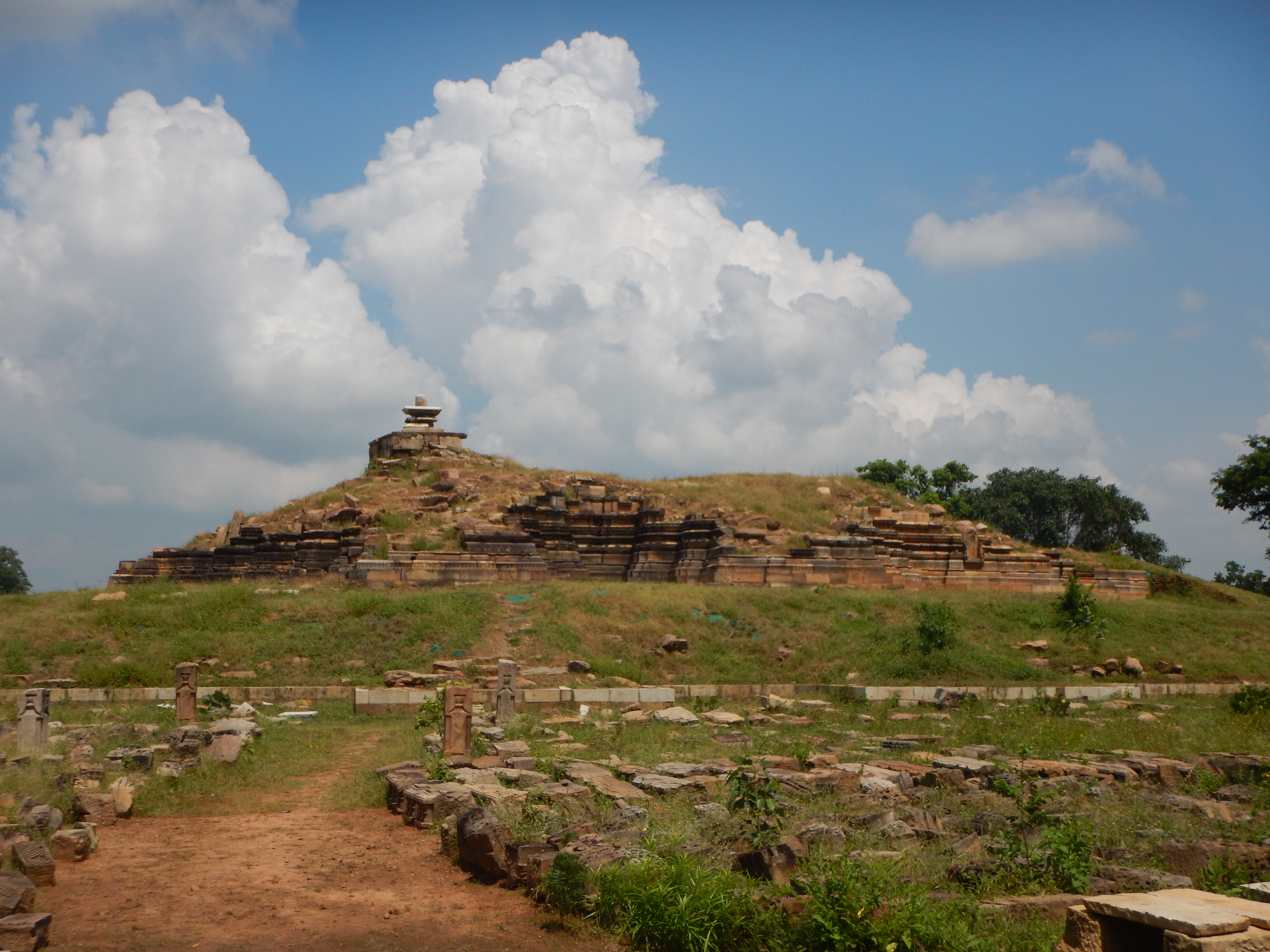
Beejamandal ruins

Beejamandal is a ruined temple in Jatkara village near Khajuraho, Madhya Pradesh, that has not yet been fully excavated and explored. It has a length of 34.60 meters and is thus longer than the largest temple of Khajuraho namely Kandariya which measures about 30 metres.

== Location and archaeological interest ==
Beejamandal which is popularly known as Vijaya Temple is situated about 2 km from Eidgah square on Vidisha-Ashoknagar road. It is rich in archaeologically interesting objects. It is said that the building was built in 8th century and was then later on reconstructed in Paramara period in the second half of the 11th century by Emperor Naravarman. Since Emperor Naravarman was a devotee of Goddess Charchika, who is also known as Vijaya, this landmark is popularly known as Vijaya temple. The building was never finished which can easily be seen by the carved niches and unfinished architectural pieces found round the base of the temple plinth. During the mughal Emperor Aurangzeb period (1658A.D.-1707 A.D.), the temple was demolished by Aurangzeb and he made a mosque over the demolished remains of the temple and named it as "Alamgir Mosque" (around 1682). Muslims started worshiping at the mosque after the construction of the mosque for many years.

In 1991, there was a heavy rain in the night in town that caused one of the walls of the mosque to fall down. Because of this destruction, many Hindu idols that were inside the mosque for more than 300 years were exposed and brought to the public attention that this is a Hindu temple. An investigation by the Archaeological Survey of India (ASI) found that the hindu idols were buried under the platform on the northern side, used as the Hall of Prayer conducted especially on the days of Eid. Figures of Goddess Mahishasur Mardini and Lord Ganesha were also recovered during the excavation in (1972-1974). Unfortunately, a stay was put on the officer of Archaeological Survey of India, who was conducting the research. As an effect, the collector of that time of the town was transferred as under his orders only as the entire investigation was happening. The stay was applied by the government to avoid any riots between Hindu and Muslims. The case is still in the court but to maintain peace and Harmony, this case is under status quo. This is not related with Beejmandal at Khajuraho. Instead, it refers to the Beejmandal near Vidisha in Bhopal.

Cunningham and Phanikanta Mishra regard this as the Vaidyanath temple mentioned in the Grahapati Kokkala inscription.

It was one of the 18 unexplored mounds in the vicinity of Khajuraho. The Archaeological Survey of India does not have the authority to excavate other mounds.

== See also ==
- Khajuraho
- Grahpati Kokalla inscription
