= Padmavati (Pawaya) =

- Village
- Possible location in present-day Madhya Pradesh, India Padmavati (Pawaya) (Madhya Pradesh)
- Coordinates: 25.77°N 78.25°E
- Country: India
- State: Madhya Pradesh
- District: Gwalior
- Elevation: 305 m (1,001 ft)

Languages
  - Official: Hindi
- Time zone: UTC+5:30 (IST)

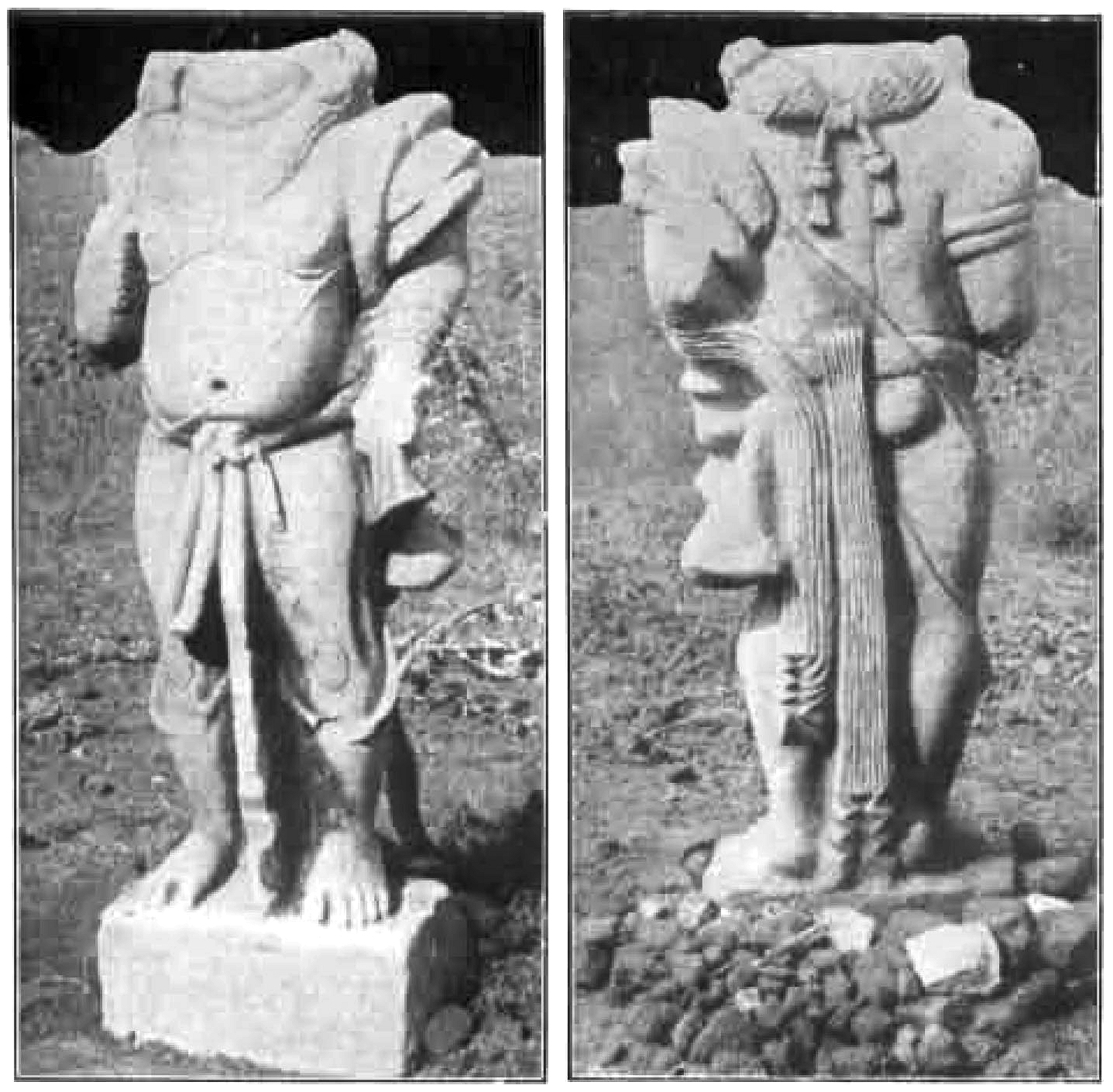
Manibhadra image at Pawaya

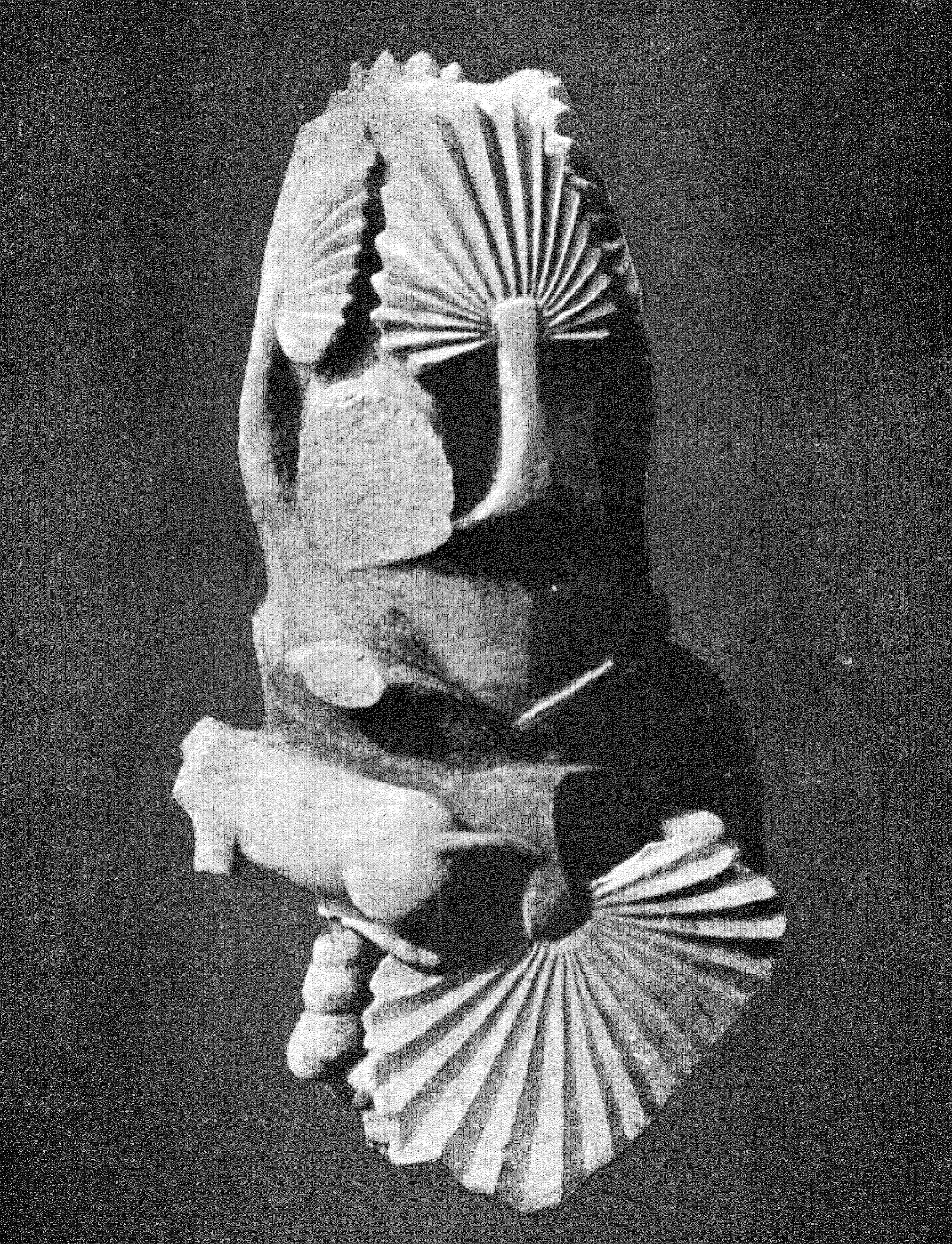
Palm capital from Pawaya, possibly Gupta period

Padmavati, identified with modern Pawaya a village in Gwalior in Madhya Pradesh, was an ancient Indian city mentioned in several classic Sanskrit texts, Malatimadhavam of Bhavabhuti, Harshacharita of Bana, and Sarasvatīkaṇṭhabharaṇa of Raja Bhoja. Bhavabhuti describes the city with tall mansions and temples with shikharas and gates, located between Para and the Sindhu rivers.

It is also mentioned in inscriptions like the Kokkala Grahapati inscription of Khajuraho. The inscription mentions that the city had rows of tall mansions. The dust used to arise because of running of strong horses.

== Identification ==
Alexander Cunningham identified Padmavati with present Narwar near Gwalior. M B Garde carried out excavations at Pawaya in 1924-25, 1933–34 and 1941. He identifies Pawaya with ancient Padmavati rejecting Cunningham’s identification with Narwar. Coins of several Naga kings, who have been dated between 210-340 AD, have been found at Pawaya.

== Antiquities ==
Among the antiquities found at Pawaya is an image of Yaksha Manibhadra. It has an inscription that mentions that it was installed in the fourth regnal year of King Sivanandi and was worshipped by the gosthas or merchants.

== See also ==
- Pawāyā Gupta image inscription
- Narwar coinage
- Grahapati Kokkala inscription

== External sources ==
- Pawaya – Glamour of the Ancient Padmavati, http://puratattva.in/2011/07/11/pawaya-glamour-of-the-ancient-padmavati-159.html
