= Oghna =

Village in Udaipur district, Rajasthan, India

Coordinates: 24.521°N 73.361°E

Ogna, also Oghna, is a village in Jhadol tehsil, Udaipur district, Rajasthan, India. It is mostly dependent on agriculture.

== History ==
In 16th century, Ogna was ruled by a Brahmin chief, Udairaj. Nahar Singh Solanki (Naharu Ji), the younger son of Rana Harpal of Panarwa, established his control of Ogna after killing Udairaj in 1585 AD. Ogna had 17 villages, with total income of 11,000 rupees. Nahar Singh’s descendants continued to rule over Ogna, till Independence, with title of Rawat.

== Sources ==
- Mathur, T.K. (1987). Feudal Polity in Mewar, 1750-1850 A.D. Publication Scheme. ISBN 978-81-85263-32-8.
- Paliwal, Dr. Devilal (2000). Panarwa ka Solanki Rajvansh. Udaipur: Janak Prakashan.
- Udaipur.Rajasthan.gov.in - Blocks, Tehsils, Panchayats
- Census of India 1961: vol XVI - Rajasthan (pdf)
