= Menal =

Indian village

Coordinates: 25°05′40″N 75°10′20″E

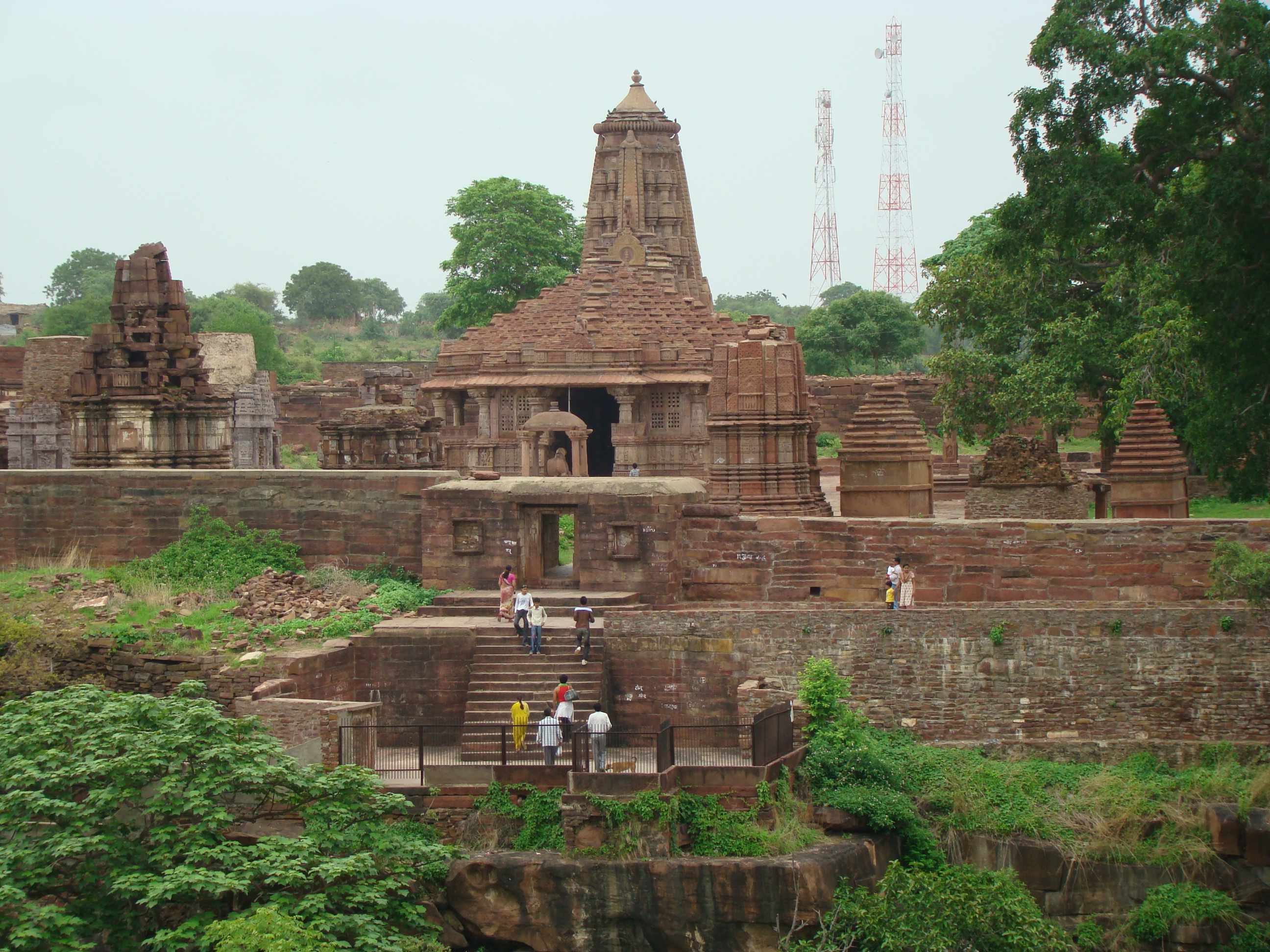
A temple in Menal

Menal is a village in Begun Taluk in chittorgarh district in Rajasthan, India.
