= Qeyamuddin Ahmad =

Indian historian (1930–1998)

- Born: September 9, 1930; Patna, Bihar and Orissa, British India
- Died: August 27, 1998
- Occupations: Historian, academic

Academic work
- Sub-discipline: Medieval Indian history, epigraphy
- Institutions: Patna University, K. P. Jayaswal Research Institute
- Notable works: The Wahhabi Movement in India (1966); Corpus of Arabic and Persian Inscriptions of Bihar (1973)

Qeyamuddin Ahmad (9 September 1930 – 27 August 1998) was an Indian historian of medieval India, particularly the history of Bihar. He served as professor of history at Patna University and was known for his work on the Wahhabi movement and the epigraphy of Bihar.

== Early life and career ==
Qeyamuddin Ahmad was born on 9 September 1930 in Patna, Bihar and Orissa, British India. Ahmad joined the Bihar Educational Service in 1952, before transferring to Patna University in 1964, where he taught history until his retirement. He began his academic career as a Research Fellow at the K. P. Jayaswal Research Institute, contributing significantly to the study of epigraphic sources across Bihar. He earned his PhD in 1962 with a dissertation on the Wahhabi Movement in India.

== Works ==
Ahmad's most notable works include:

- The Wahhabi Movement in India (1966; revised ed. 1994; Urdu translation 1976), a study of the 19th-century Islamic revivalist movement.
- Corpus of Arabic and Persian Inscriptions of Bihar (A.H. 640–1200) (1973), cataloguing 196 inscriptions from the pre-Mughal, Pathan, and Mughal periods.
- An abridged edition of Al-Biruni’s India published by National Book Trust (1985).
- Associate editor of Comprehensive History of Bihar (Vol. II Part I, 1983; Part II, 1986).
- Co-editor of Patna Through the Ages: Glimpses of History, Society and Economy (1987).

== Legacy ==
Ahmad was regarded as an authority on medieval Indian history, regional historiography, and Islamic movements in Bihar. His peers praised his meticulous research and dedication to preserving historical sources.
