= Nagas of Vidisha =

Dynasty of Vidisha in central India

The Naga (IAST: Nāga) dynasty of Vidisha in central India is known from the Puranas, and probably ruled in the first century BCE. No inscriptions of the dynasty have been discovered. Historian K. P. Jayaswal attributed some coins issued by the Datta rulers of Mathura, to this dynasty, but later historians have disputed his theory.

== Rulers ==
The Nagas probably ruled at Vidisha during the first century BCE.

According to the Puranas, the following Naga kings ruled Vaidisha (kingdom of Vidisha):

1. Bhogi alias Bhogin
  - He is said to have conquered the cities of his enemies and exalted his family
2. Sada-chandra alias Chandramsha (Candrāṃśa) or Vama-chandra (Rama-chandra in the Vishnu Purana)
  - He is described as the second Nakhavant (according to one theory, this word is a variation of "Nakhapana", and refers to the Kshatrapa ruler Nahapana)
3. Dhana-dharma (also Dhana-dharman or Dhana-varma)
4. Vangara
5. Bhuti-nanda

The Puranas mention the Naga king Shesha ("Śeṣa Nāgarāja") as the father of Bhogi, but historian A. S. Altekar theorized that Shesha is a mythical figure (see Shesha and Nagaraja), because the Puranas explicitly describe Vangara as the dynasty's fourth king (if Shesha was a historical king, Vangara would become the fifth king).

After mentioning these kings of Vidisha, the Puranas refer to the king Shishu-nandi (Śiśunandi) and his descendants, who ruled after the decline of the Shunga dynasty. According to one interpretation, Shishunandi and his successors, which included Nandi-yashas (Nandiyaśas) and Shishuka (Śiśuka), were the Naga kings of Vidisha.

== Coins ==
No inscriptions of the dynasty have been discovered. Several coins issued by the kings whose names end in "-datta" have been discovered at Mathura and its neighbouring places. These kings include Shesha-datta, Rama-datta, Shishu-chandra-datta, Shiva-datta, Purusha-datta, Uttama-datta, Kama-datta, and Bhava-datta. These kings are usually identified as members of the distinct Datta dynasty. However, historian K. P. Jayaswal theorized that these kings were actually the Naga rulers of Vidisha: he identified Shesha-Nagaraja with Shesha-datta, Rama-chandra with Rama-datta, and Shishu-nandi with Shishu-chandra-datta. Jayaswal argued that these coins were found at Mathura, because that city has been a major market for coins since, the ancient times. He also read the suffix mentioned on the coins as "-data" ("donor") instead of "-datta", and asserted that "Rama-datta" should be read as "Rama, the celebrated donor". Jayaswal further argued that the Puranas describe the Naga kings of Vidisha as "vrisha" (IAST: vṛṣa, "bull"), and that the symbol Shiva's bull Nandi) appears on the Mathura coins.

Historian A. S. Altekar disputed Jayaswal's theory based on several arguments:

- Coins similar to the ones found at Mathura have not been discovered at Vidisha.
- During the excavations led by D. R. Bhandarkar, five coins of the later Naga rulers Bhima-naga and Ganapati-naga were discovered at the Besnagar site in Vidisha. These coins are smaller in size compared to the Mathura coins of the Datta kings, but do not fail to append "-naga" to the king's name. On the other hand, the bigger coins of Mathura have enough space to include the suffix "-naga", but none of them do so.
- No historical inscriptions or texts append the suffix "-data" to a king's name to indicate that he was a celebrated donor.
- Only some manuscripts of the Vayu Purana describe the Naga kings of Vidisha as "vrisha": other manuscripts use the word "nripa" (IAST: nṛpa, "king") instead. "Vrisha" appears to be a scribal mistake in some manuscripts.
- The bull symbol does not appear on all the Mathura coins: it is featured only on a single variety of coins issued by Rama-datta.
- The wavy or straight lines appearing on the Mathura coins cannot be interpreted as a naga (serpent) symbol: they represent other objects, such as a tree, or are used for decorative purposes. Moreover, no serpent symbol occurs on the coins of the rulers confirmed to be Nagas, such as the Nagas of Padmavati.
- If the "Datta" kings of Mathura were the Naga kings of Vidisha, they would have been mentioned in the Puranas. However, Jayaswal could identify only some of the Datta kings with the Naga kings of the Puranas, and that too, after "taking considerable liberty" with their names.

== See also ==
- Nagas of Padmavati
