= Panarwa thikana =

Jagir of Solanki Rajputs in Bhomat, Mewar

Panarwa Thikana पानरवा ठिकाना
- Thikana of Mewar State
- 1478–1949
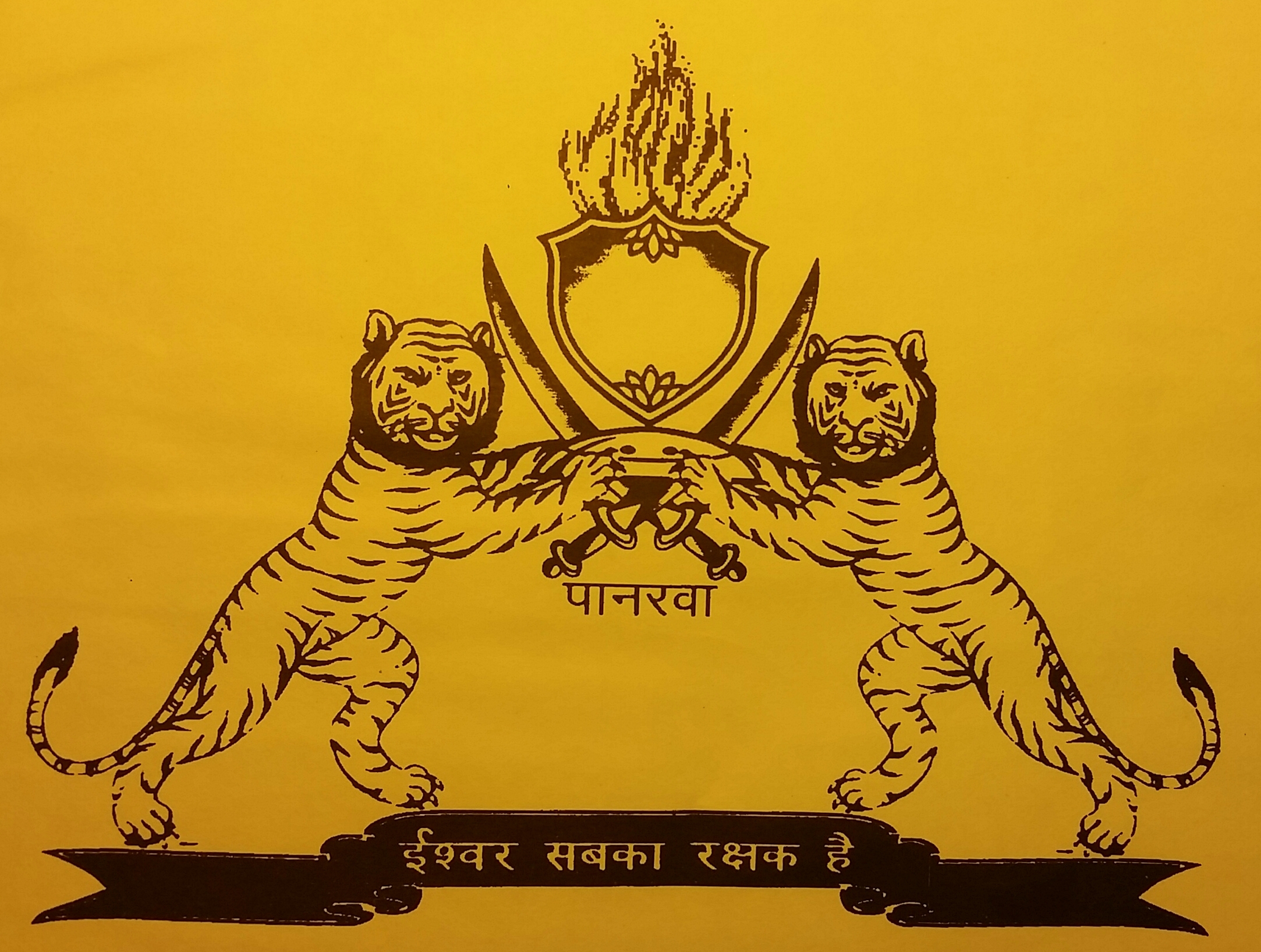
- Coat of arms

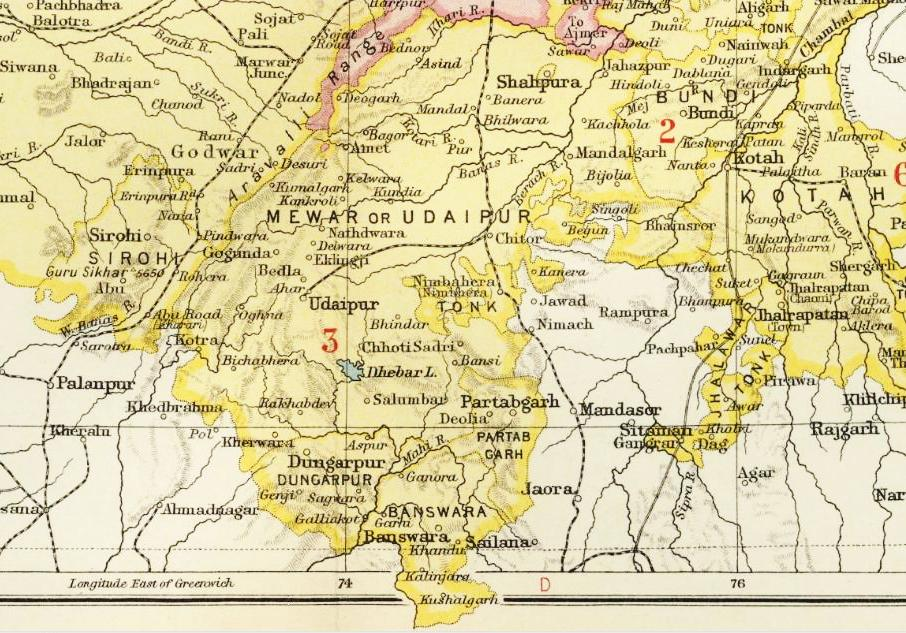
- Udaipur State in the Imperial Gazetteer of India
- Area
  - 1478 AD: 520 km^{2} (200 sq mi)
- History
  - Established: 1478
  - Independence of India: 1949
Succeeded by
India
- Today part of: India

Panarwa was a thikana of Solanki Rajputs, in the former Mewar State in present-day Rajasthan, India. It was founded c. 1478.

== History ==
Descendants of Solanki Kings of Patan spread over Rajasthan and Gujarat. One branch moved to Sirohi, from which Akshayraj Solanki, who was the grandson of Bhoja Solanki of Lach, entered Bhomat, killed Jeevraj Yadav(a Ahir King), and established Panarwa as his principal seat in 1478 AD. Bhil Gametis of this region entered into the service of Akhairaj.

In 16th century, Rawat Harpal Solanki, a descendant of Akshayraj and chief of Panarwa provided help to Maharana Udai Singh when he entered into Bhomat hills and Maharana Udai Singh granted him the title of Rana. From then on, Thakurs of Panarwa were called Rana.

Rana Harpal's second son, Nahar Singh, captured Ogna and established Thikana of Oghna.

Rana Duda succeeded Rana Harpal, as Rana of Panarwa, but died shortly and then his son, Rana Punja (Rana Poonja) became the Rana of Panarwa. Rana Punja is known for his role in struggle of Maharana Pratap against Mughals.

Punja's descendant Rana Chandrabhan also provided help to Maharana Raj Singh during his war against Aurangzeb.

== Judicial powers ==
In 1932, Mohabbat Singh Solanki, Rana of Panarwa was granted second class Judicial powers, which empowered it to issue sentencing up to one year and fine up to 300 rupees. In 1945, Panarwa was granted first class Judicial Powers.

== Revenue ==
Capital of Panarwa Thikana was Manpur. Area of Panarwa Thikana was over 520 square kilometres (200 sq mi). It consisted of 101 villages and its annual revenue was 15,637 rupees.

== Rulers ==
1. Rawat AkshayRaj Solanki
2. Rawat Raj Singh
3. Rawat Mahipal
4. Rana Harpal
5. Rana Duda
6. Rana Punja
7. Rana Rama
8. Rana Chandrabhan
9. Rana Surajmal
10. Rana Bhagwandas
11. Rana Jodh Singh
12. Rana Raghunath Singh
13. Rana Nathu Singh
14. Rana Guman Singh
15. Rana Kirat Singh
16. Rana Kesari Singh
17. Rana Udai Singh
18. Rana Pratap Singh
19. Rana Bhawani Singh
20. Rana Arjun Singh
21. Rana Mohabbat Singh
22. Rana Manohar Singh

== Current head ==
The current Chief of Panarwa Royal family is Rana Manohar Singh Solanki.
