= Bijolia movement =

Peasant movement in Rajasthan (1897-1941)

- Date: 1897 - 1941
- Caused by: Excessive land revenue exactions
- Goals: Reduction of land revenue and other taxes
- Methods: Non-cooperation, Nonviolent resistance, Civil Disobedience, No Tax Campaign

The Bijolia movement (Hindi: बिजोलिया आंदोलन) was a peasant movement in the Bijolia jagir of the former Mewar state (in present-day Rajasthan in India) against excessive land revenue exactions. Originating in the former jagir (feudal estate) of Bijolia (near the town of Bijolia in Bhilwara district), the movement gradually spread to neighbouring jagirs. Leadership to the movement was provided, at different times, by Fateh Karan Charan, Sadhu Sitaram Das, Vijay Singh Pathik, and Manikyalal Verma. The movement continued till 1941 after a bitter struggle lasting about half a century, gained national attention and resisted state oppression.

== Origins ==
Land revenue and other taxes were the main issues behind the movement. Bijolia was a jagir in Mewar State, ruled by the Parmar jagirdar, one of the leading 16 nobles (solah umrao) in Mewar State. Peasant discontent started after the accession of Rao Sawai Kishan Singh ji to the jagir in 1894. "Rao Sawai" was the title given to the Jagirdars of the Pawar /Parmar dynasty who ruled on Bijolia; Rao Sawai Kishan Singh ji shuffled the administrative personnel of the jagir and the new officials were encouraged to realize more revenue from peasants. Certain taxis (lagat) which were formerly imposed under extraordinary circumstances for short periods were now made to last longer.

== Early Phase (1897-1915) ==
In 1897, a delegation of peasants consisting of Nanji Patel of Berisal and Thakari Patel of Gopal Niwas went to Udaipur and attempted, in vain, to get an audience with the Maharana. But the Maharana did institute an inquiry which concluded that certain taxes had been arbitrarily imposed by the jagirdar. The Maharana issued a warning to the jagirdar, which only resulted in him retaliating against the two delegates who had gone to Udaipur. The peasants continued appeals to the jagirdar who ultimate granted some concessions to the peasants in 1904.

The concessions granted in 1904 did not last. In 1906, Prithvi Singh ascended to the jagir and withdrew the concessions granted in 1904 and instructed officials to collect increased taxes. Failing to get a hearing from the jagirdar, some peasants chose not to cultivate their lands and migrated to neighboring Gwalior and Bundi. Some more concessions were promised to the peasants in 1914, but were never implemented.

In 1913, about 15,000 farmers, under the leadership of Fateh Karan Charan, launched a 'No Tax' campaign under which they decided to leave the land uncultivated and instead farm the rented plots in the neighbouring areas of Bundi, Gwalior, and Mewar states. This resulted in untilled lands all across Bijolia and led to a massive decline in the estate's revenue in addition to food shortage.

== Second Phase (1915-1923) ==
In 1916, war fund contributions were further imposed on the peasants which lead to renewed dissatisfaction. It was in 1916 that Bhoop Singh alias Vijai Singh Pathik arrived in Bijolia and organized the peasants under the Bijolia Kisan Panchayat to oppose payments to the war fund and other taxes. Petitions were sent to the Maharana, and stories of the agitation started receiving publicity in various newspapers. Partially because of the negative publicity in the press, the Maharana appointed a commission of inquiry, which found the peasants' grievances to be genuine and recommended the abolition of some taxes and begar (unpaid or forced labor). But the Maharana failed to act on the report and the oppression as well as the movement led by Pathik continued.

After the failure of the inquiry to yield results, Pathik advised peasants to cultivate unirrigated lands which were subject to lower taxes. In February 1920, the Maharana appointed another commission of inquiry which also reached the same conclusions as the earlier commission. Other jagirdars feared that the Maharana's intervention would result in a chain reaction, and influenced the Maharana to not act on the commission's report. Nonetheless, these efforts attracted the attention of national leaders towards the Bijolia movement and it succeeded in obtaining their support.

Hence, the peasant movement of Bijolia continued to get increased publicity and began to spread to other jagirs such as Begun, Parsoli, and Bhinder. In December 1921, the Mewar State Resident reported:

The unrest is now spreading to Bhinder, an estate under the darbar management, where the cultivators are refusing the pay revenue. The situation in Bijolia and in the neighbouring thikanas of Parsoli, Begun and Basi has distinctly deteriorated. There is a general refusal to pay revenue. There is threat of violence if any attempt is made to collect revenue or to enforce official orders...An atmosphere of discontent is being created and the movement is spreading.

This compelled the Agent to the Governor General to visit the various jagirs of Mewar and direct the jagirdar and Mewar State to conclude an agreement with the peasants. Finally, the Bijolia Agreement was signed on 11 February 1922. The agreement brought about the following changes: reduction in amount of talwar bandhi, no taxes when there was no cultivation, reduction in chatoond tax and land revenue, etc.

== Third Phase (1923-1941) ==
By 1928, there was a general complain among the peasants of Bijolia that the agreement of 1922 had been violated by the jagirdar. The peasants also complained that taxes on unirrigated lands were very high and jagir authorities were interfering in the affairs of the Bijolia Kisan Panchayat.

== Bibliography ==
- Ram Pande (1974). Agrarian Movement in Rajasthan. University Publishers (India).
- Pema Ram (1986). Agrarian movement in Rajasthan, 1913-1947 A.D. Panchsheel Prakashan.
