= Nagas of Padmavati =

3rd-4th century dynasty of northern India

- early 3rd century–mid-4th century
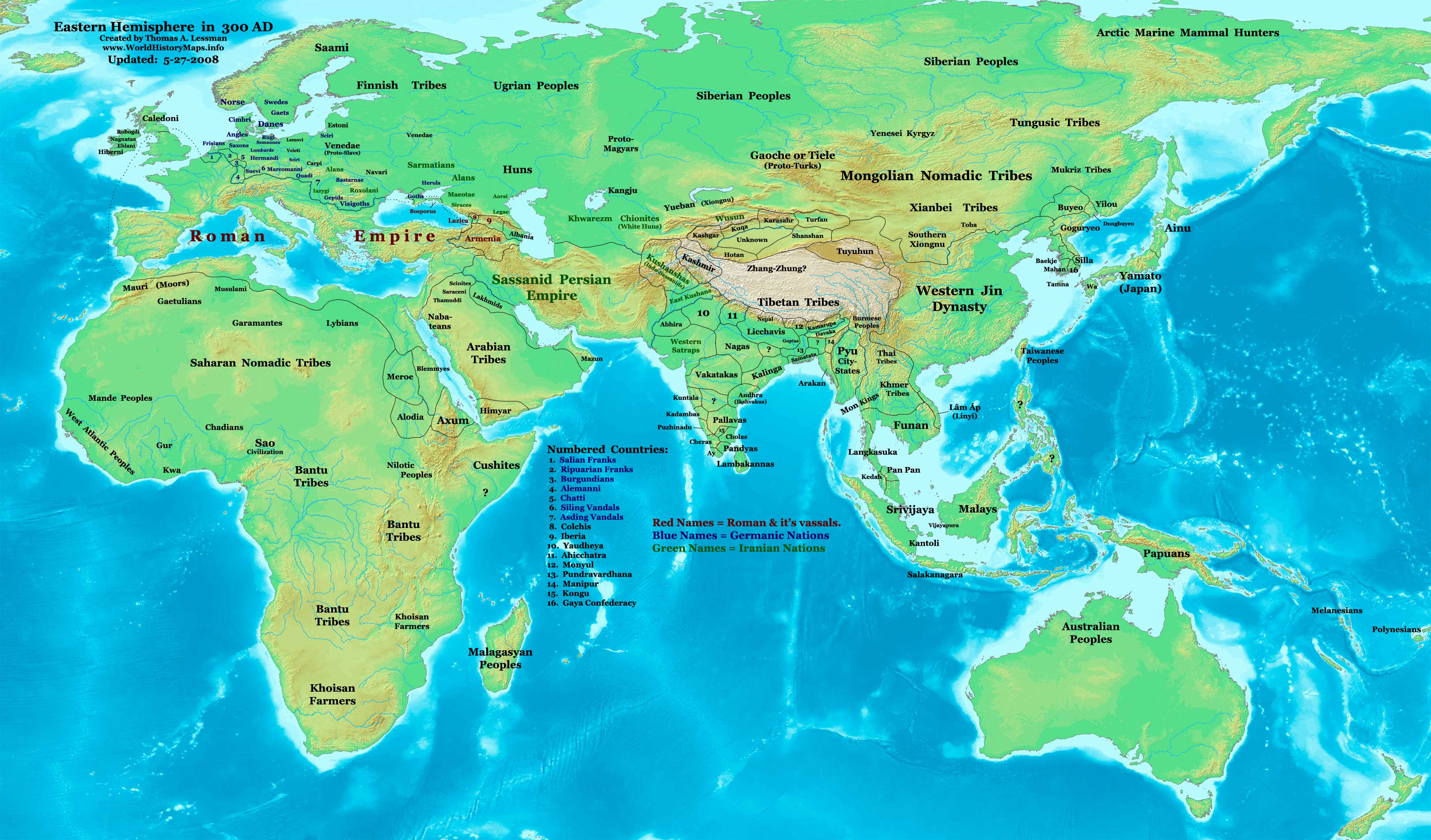
- The Nagas shown at their greatest extent, along with the rising Guptas.
- Status: Empire
- Capital: Padmavati
- Common languages: Sanskrit; Prakrit
- Religion: Hinduism
- Government: Monarchy
- Maharaja
- History
  - Established: early 3rd century
  - Disestablished: mid-4th century
| Preceded by | Succeeded by |
| Kushan Empire | Gupta Empire |
- Today part of: India

The Naga (IAST: Nāga) dynasty ruled parts of north-central India during the 3rd and the 4th centuries, after the decline of the Kushan Empire and before the rise of the Gupta Empire. Its capital was located at Padmavati, which is identified with modern Pawaya near Gwalior, in Madhya Pradesh. Modern historians identify it with the family that is called Bharashiva (IAST: Bhāraśiva) in the records of the Vakataka dynasty.

According to the Puranic texts as well as numismatic evidence, dynasties known as the Nagas also ruled at Vidisha, Kantipuri, and Mathura. All these Naga dynasties may have been different branches of a single family, or may have been a single family that ruled from different capitals at different times. No concrete conclusions can be drawn regarding this based on the available historical evidence.

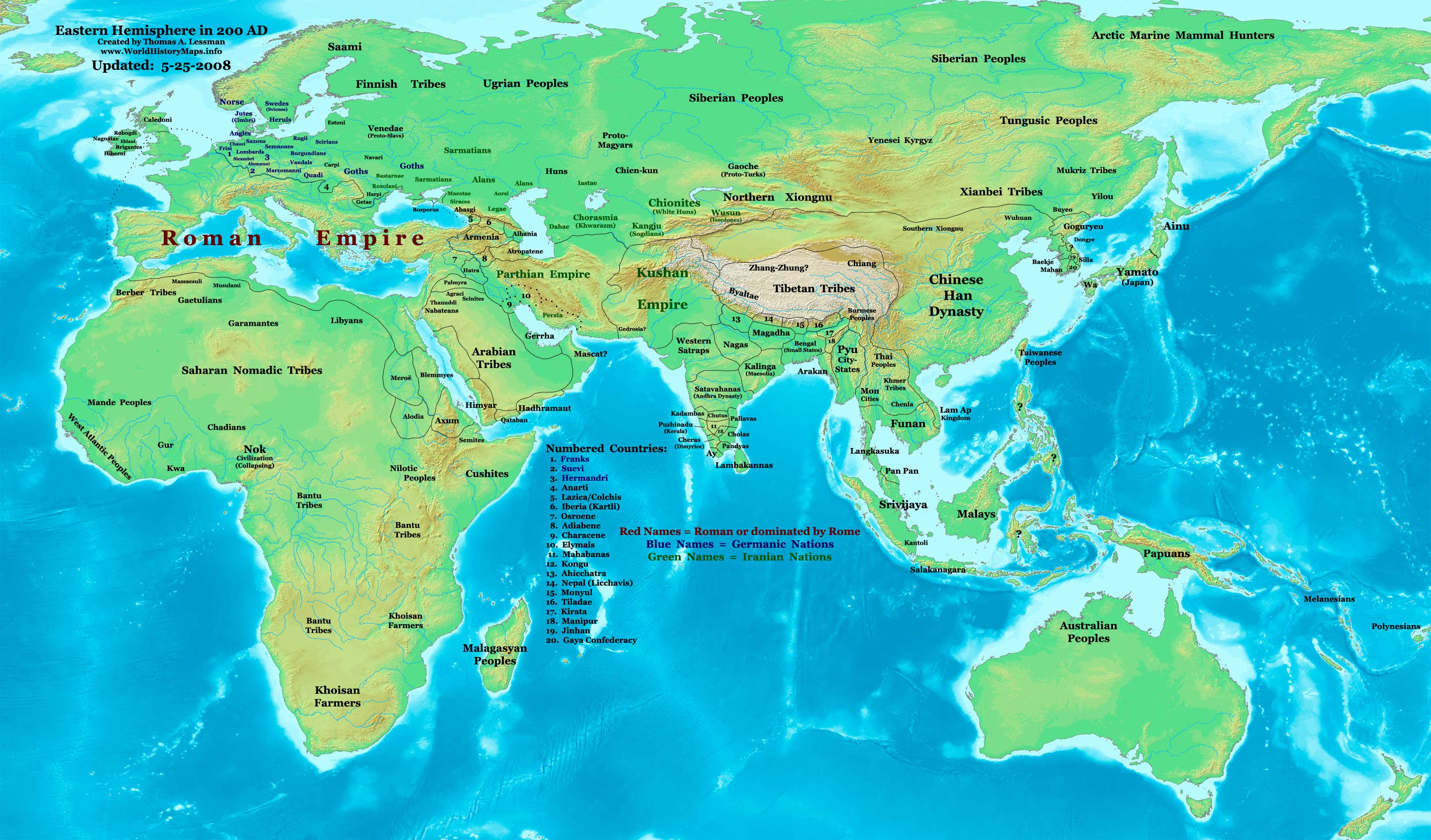
Eastern Hemisphere in 200 CE

== Territory ==
Find spots of the Naga coins

In Madhya Pradesh, Naga coins have been discovered at Pawaya, Narwar, Gohad, Vidisha, Kutwar (Kotwal), and Ujjain. In Uttar Pradesh, they have been discovered at Mathura, and in the Jhansi district.

Based on the provenance of these coins, H. V. Trivedi theorizes that the core Naga territory extended from Morena and Jhansi districts in north to Vidisha in south. The Naga kingdom eventually expanded to include Mathura in north and Ujjain in south.

== Chronology ==
The Naga dynasty is known mainly from the coins issued by its rulers, and from brief mentions in literary texts and inscriptions of the other dynasties. According to the Vayu and the Brahmanda Puranas, nine Naga kings ruled Padmavati (or Champavati), and seven Naga kings ruled Mathura, before the Guptas. According to the Vishnu Purana, nine Naga kings ruled at Padmavati, Kantipuri, and Mathura.

The Puranas state that only nine Naga kings ruled at Padmavati, but coins of twelve kings believed to be Naga kings by modern historians have been discovered. The coins of eleven of these rulers have been discovered at Padmavati (modern Pawaya): the only exception is Vyaghra, who is known from a single coin discovered at the nearby Narwar.

The inscriptions of the Vakataka dynasty (such as those from Chamak and Tirodi) state the mother of the Vakataka king Rudrasena was a daughter of the Bharashiva king Bhava-naga. This Bhava-naga has been identified with the Naga king of same name, whose coins have been discovered at Padmavati. Rudrasena's reign is dated to c. 335–355, therefore, his maternal grandfather Bhava-naga can be dated to the early 4th century CE. Historian H. V. Trivedi assumes that Bhava-naga ruled for around 25 years, based on the large number and variety of coins issued by him, dating his rule to c. 310-335 CE.

The Allahabad Pillar inscription of Samudragupta (r. c. 335–380) mentions Ganapati-naga as one of the kings defeated by him. Thus, Ganapati can be dated to the mid-4th century. The other Naga rulers cannot be dated with certainty, but H. V. Trivedi came up with the following tentative chronological list of Naga rulers, based on numismatic and palaeographic evidence:

1. Vrisha-naga alias Vrisha-bhava or Vrishabha, possibly ruled at Vidisha in the late 2nd century
  - Vrishabha or Vrisha-bhava may also be the name of a distinct king who succeeded Vrisha-naga
2. Bhima-naga, r. c. 210–230 CE, probably the first king to rule from Padmavati
3. Skanda-naga
4. Vasu-naga
5. Brihaspati-naga
6. Vibhu-naga
7. Ravi-naga
8. Bhava-naga
9. Prabhakara-naga
10. Deva-naga
11. Vyaghra-naga
12. Ganapati-naga

Since the Nagas of Kantipuri are known only from a passing mention in the Vishnu Purana, it is possible that Kantipuri was a subsidiary capital of the dynasty. Historian K. P. Jayaswal attributed several coins to the Nagas of Kantipuri, reading the names on these coins as Haya-naga, Traya-naga, Barhina-naga, Chharaja-naga, Bhava-naga, and Rudra-sena. However, other scholars, such as A. S. Altekar have disagreed with Jayaswal's reading of the coin legends, and disputed the attribution of these coins to the Nagas. According to Altekar, only one of the coins mentioned by Jayaswal possibly bears the legend "Traya-naga". Jayaswal identified Kantipuri as present-day Kantit in Mirzapur district, connecting the Bharashivas to the local Bhar kings. However, there is no evidence to support this identification. No Naga kings have been found at Kantit, and Kotwal (also Kutwal or Kutwar) in Morena district is a better candidate for the location of Kantipuri.

== Origin ==
According to the Puranas, the Naga kings ruled at Padmavati (or Champavati), Kantipuri (or Kantipura), Mathura, and Vidisha (see Nagas of Vidisha). Based on the available information, it cannot be said with certainty if these Naga dynasties were different families, different branches of the same family, or a single family that ruled from all these locations at different times, moving its capital to a new location each time. H. V. Trivedi, the editor of the Catalogue of the Coins of the Naga Kings of Padmavati, theorized that the Naga dynasty probably originated at Vidisha, from where its members moved northwards to Padmavati, Kantipuri, and Mathura.

Earlier, historian K. P. Jayaswal had theorized that the Naga dynasty was established by a 2nd-century ruler named Nava-naga. Based on the misinterpretation of the word nava (which can mean "new" or "nine") in the Puranas as "new", he speculated that a king called Nava had established a new dynasty. According to him, the coins bearing the legend "Navasa" (or "Nevasa") were issued by this king. Jayaswal interpreted a symbol on this coin as a serpent (nāga) with raised hood. He further theorized that Nava-naga's successor was Virasena, whose coins have been discovered in present-day western Uttar Pradesh and eastern Punjab. According to Jayaswal, Virasena evicted the Kushan rulers from Mathura, and subsequently, the Naga dynasty was divided into three branches, which ruled from Mathura, Padmavati, and Kantipuri.

Jayaswal's theory has been disputed by other historians, based on the following points:

- The Puranic verse containing the word nava means that nine (not "new") Naga kings ruled at Padmavati; this interpretation is supported by the fact that the next verse mentions that seven Naga kings ruled at Mathura.
- The coins bearing the legend "Navsasa" are not similar to the coins of the Nagas of Padmavati:
  - they do not feature the suffix "-naga", which occurs on the Padmavati coins
  - they weigh substantially more: 65 grains, as opposed to the Padmavati coins which weigh 9, 18, 36 and 50 grains
  - they always feature a bull; the Padmavati coins occasionally feature a bull, which is often replaced by other symbols that do not occur on the Navasa coins)
- No Navasa coins have been discovered at Padmavati: these coins have been discovered around Kaushambi, and are similar to the other coins issued from that city, which suggests that the issuer was a king of Kaushambi.
- The purported serpent symbol on these coins appears to be a serpent only on a single specimen published by the Indian Museum, Kolkata: after examining the other specimens, historian A. S. Altekar concluded that the symbol cannot be interpreted as a serpent with certainty.
- Even if the coins featured a serpent symbol, this cannot be considered as the evidence for the issuer being a Naga king: none of the coins issued by the Nagas of Padmavati feature a serpent symbol. The serpent symbol occurs on the coins of several other rulers of northern India, none of whom were Nagas.
- Virasena's coins are rectangular unlike the circular coins issued by the Nagas of Padmavati, and feature different symbols. Also, they are much bigger than the Padmavati coins, and bear the legend "Virasenasa" without the suffix "-naga" which occurs on the Padmavati coins.
- Virasena's coins feature a vertical wavy line which Jayaswal interpreted as a serpent (naga): however, the line actually represents the long stake of a lotus being held by the goddess Lakshmi.

== Political history ==
The Nagas rose to power after the decline of the Kushan Empire in north-central India, in the early 3rd century. The Vakataka inscription that mentions the Bharashiva king Bhava-naga states that the Bharashivas performed ashvamedha (horse sacrifices) ten times. The ashvamedha ceremony was used by the Indian kings to prove their imperial sovereignty, and therefore, the identification of the Bharashivas with the Nagas has led to suggestions that the Nagas assumed a sovereign status after defeating the Kushan rulers. However, there is no concrete evidence for this: several other powers, including the Yaudheyas and the Malavas, rose to prominence in this period, and the decline of the Kushan power in this region may be alternatively attributed to them. It is also possible that a confederation of these powers defeated the Kushan rulers, or they independently, but simultaneously, took control of the Kushan territories.

Several Naga coins feature a bull (vrisha in Sanskrit), and Vrisha was also the name of a Naga king known from coinage. H. V. Trivedi theorized that Vrisha was the founder of the dynasty, and initially ruled at Vidisha, where several Naga coins have been discovered. The Vakataka inscription mentions that the Bharashiva family obtained the holy water of the Ganges for their coronation by the prowess of their arms. Therefore, Trivedi theorized that the Nagas (that is, the Bharashivas) subsequently migrated northwards (towards the Ganges), establishing their rule at Padmavati. From there, they advanced up to Kantipuri and Mathura in the process of invading the Kushan territory. Bhima-naga, whose coins bear the title Maharaja, may have been the dynasty's first king to rule from Padmavati.

The Allahabad Pillar inscription of the Gupta king Samudragupta states that he defeated Ganapati-naga. This suggests that Ganapati-naga was the last Naga king, and after his defeat, the Naga territory was annexed to the Gupta Empire. The inscription also mentions two other rulers - Nagadatta and Nagasena, whose identity is not certain. According to Harsha-charita, Nagasena was a Naga ruler of Padmavati, but neither of these kings are attested by any coins.

== See also ==
- Narwar coinage
- History of Madhya Pradesh

| Timeline and cultural period | Indus plain (Punjab-Sapta Sindhu-Gujarat) | Gangetic Plain | | | Central India | Southern India |
| Timeline and cultural period | Indus plain (Punjab-Sapta Sindhu-Gujarat) | Upper Gangetic Plain (Ganga-Yamuna doab) | Middle Gangetic Plain | Lower Gangetic Plain | Central India | Southern India |
IRON AGE
| Culture | Late Vedic Period | Late Vedic Period; Painted Grey Ware culture | Late Vedic Period; Northern Black Polished Ware | | Pre-history | |
| 6th century BCE | Gandhara | Kuru-Panchala | Magadha | | Adivasi (tribes) | Assaka |
| Culture | Persian-Greek influences | "Second Urbanisation"; Rise of Shramana movements Jainism - Buddhism - Ājīvika - Yoga | | | Pre-history | |
| 5th century BCE | (Persian conquests) | | Shaishunaga dynasty | | Adivasi (tribes) | Assaka |
| 4th century BCE | (Greek conquests) | Nanda empire | | | | |
HISTORICAL AGE
| Culture | Spread of Buddhism | | | | Pre-history | |
| 3rd century BCE | Maurya Empire | | | | | Satavahana dynasty Sangam period (300 BCE – 200 CE); Early Cholas; Early Pandyan kingdom Cheras |
| Culture | Preclassical Hinduism (Note: Michaels (2004) p.39) - "Hindu Synthesis" (Note: Hiltebeitel (2002)) (ca. 200 BCE - 300 CE) (Note: Michaels (2004) p.39) (Note: Hiltebeitel (2002)); Epics - Puranas - Ramayana - Mahabharata - Bhagavad Gita - Brahma Sutras - Smarta Tradition; Mahayana Buddhism | | | | | |
| 2nd century BCE | Indo-Greek Kingdom | | Shunga Empire; Maha-Meghavahana Dynasty | | | Satavahana dynasty Sangam period (300 BCE – 200 CE); Early Cholas; Early Pandyan kingdom Cheras |
| 1st century BCE | Indo-Greek Kingdom | | Shunga Empire; Maha-Meghavahana Dynasty | | | Satavahana dynasty Sangam period (300 BCE – 200 CE); Early Cholas; Early Pandyan kingdom Cheras |
| 1st century CE | Indo-Scythians; Indo-Parthians | | Kuninda Kingdom | | | Satavahana dynasty Sangam period (300 BCE – 200 CE); Early Cholas; Early Pandyan kingdom Cheras |
| 2nd century | Kushan Empire | | | | | Satavahana dynasty Sangam period (300 BCE – 200 CE); Early Cholas; Early Pandyan kingdom Cheras |
| 3rd century | Kushano-Sasanian Kingdom; Western Satraps | Kushan Empire | | Kamarupa kingdom | Adivasi (tribes) | Satavahana dynasty Sangam period (300 BCE – 200 CE); Early Cholas; Early Pandyan kingdom Cheras |
| Culture | "Golden Age of Hinduism"(ca. CE 320-650) (Note: Michaels (2004) p.40); Puranas - Kural; Co-existence of Hinduism and Buddhism | | | | | |
| 4th century | Kidarites | Gupta Empire; Varman dynasty | | | | Andhra Ikshvakus; Kalabhra dynasty Kadamba Dynasty; Western Ganga Dynasty |
| 5th century | Hephthalite Empire | Alchon Huns | | | | Vishnukundina; Kalabhra dynasty |
| 6th century | Nezak Huns; Kabul Shahi; Maitraka | | | | Adivasi (tribes) | Vishnukundina; Badami Chalukyas; Kalabhra dynasty |
| Culture | Late-Classical Hinduism (ca. CE 650-1100) (Note: Michaels (2004) p.41); Advaita Vedanta - Tantra; Decline of Buddhism in India | | | | | |
| 7th century | Indo-Sassanids | | Vakataka dynasty Empire of Harsha | Mlechchha dynasty | Adivasi (tribes) | Badami Chalukyas; Eastern Chalukyas; Pandyan kingdom (revival); Pallava |
| 7th century | Karkota dynasty | | | | Adivasi (tribes) | |
| 8th century | Kabul Shahi | Pala Empire | | | Adivasi (tribes) | Eastern Chalukyas; Pandyan kingdom Kalachuri |
| 9th century | Gurjara-Pratihara | | | | Adivasi (tribes) | Rashtrakuta Empire; Eastern Chalukyas; Pandyan kingdom Medieval Cholas; Chera Perumals of Makkotai |
| 10th century | Ghaznavids | | | Pala dynasty Kamboja-Pala dynasty | Adivasi (tribes) | Kalyani Chalukyas; Eastern Chalukyas; Medieval Cholas; Chera Perumals of Makkotai; Rashtrakuta |
References and sources for table References Sources: Flood, Gavin D. (1996), An Introduction to Hinduism, Cambridge University Press; Hiltebeitel, Alf (2002), Hinduism. In: Joseph Kitagawa, "The Religious Traditions of Asia: Religion, History, and Culture", Routledge; Michaels, Axel (2004), Hinduism. Past and present, Princeton, New Jersey: Princeton University Press
