= Pandit Arjun Lal Sethi =

Indian freedom fighter and educator (1880–1941)

- Born: 9 September 1880; Jaipur, Jaipur State
- Died: 22 December 1941 (aged 61); Ajmer, Ajmer-Merwara
- Education: University of Allahabad
- Occupations: Freedom fighter, revolutionary, educator
- Organization(s): Jaipur Praja Mandal; Indian National Congress
- Known for: Indian independence movement in Rajasthan
- Notable work: Shudra Mukti; Stree Mukti; Mahendra Kumar
- Title: Father of the freedom movement in Rajasthan
- Movement: Indian independence movement

Shri Arjun Lal Sethi (9 September 1880 – 22 December 1941) was a freedom fighter, revolutionary, and educator from Jaipur. He is sometimes termed the father of the freedom movement in Rajasthan. He was the founder of the Congress party in Rajasthan and the Jaipur Praja Mandal

== Background ==
Arjun Lai Sethi was born in a Jain family at Jaipur. He earned his B.A. degree in Persian in 1902.

== India's freedom movement ==
He worked as Kamdar in Jaipur State, but soon left the service, distressed with the behaviour of the English with the Indian people. He was an active participant in revolutionary movements between the years 1905–12. While serving as Head Master of Kalyanmal Mahavidyalaya at Indore, he was arrested and was kept in custody for six years, until 1922, at Jaipur and Vellore.

Daily newspapers from various provinces and senior leaders had initiated movements for his release. Annie Besant, met the Viceroy for this purpose. As he had taken a vow not to consume food without worshiping Jain Tirthankar's idol, he fasted in the jail for seventy days.

== Death ==
He died at Ajmer on 22 December 1941, at the age of sixty-one, and was buried there.

== See also ==
- Narayan Hari Apte
- Kesari Singh Barahath
