= K. P. Jayaswal =

Indian historian and lawyer (1881–1937)

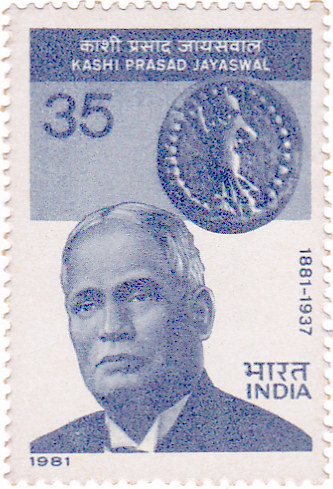
Jayaswal on a 1981 stamp of India

Kashi Prasad Jayaswal (27 November 1881 – 4 August 1937) was an Indian historian and lawyer. Jayaswal's works Hindu Polity (1918) and History of India, 150 A.D. to 350 A.D. (1933) are classics of ancient Indian historical literature. Among other things, he is credited with showing that Indian republics, based on principles of representation and collective decision-making, were among the most democratic polities of the ancient world.

== Biography ==
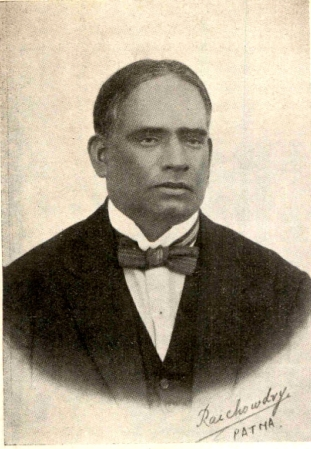

K. P. Jayaswal was born in Mirzapur, North-Western Provinces (now in Uttar Pradesh), and graduated from Allahabad University. He left India for Britain in 1906 aged 25. "He was permitted to go to England on condition he would not take food touched by anyone there, except hi Brahmin cook who accompanied him and that he remained a vegetarian" (Hindu Polity - Appreciations)> He went on to Jesus College, Oxford University, where he was awarded the Davis Scholarship in Chinese and graduated with a M.A. in Ancient Indian History in 1909. He was called to the Bar of Lincoln's Inn in London in 1910. After returning to India, Jayaswal set up practice at the Calcutta High Court, where he came into contact with Sir Ashutosh Mukherjee, who inspired Jayaswal to undertake further research in ancient Indian history. Jayaswal moved to Patna in 1916, and remained there.

A prolific scholar, Jayaswal wrote more than 120 research papers in addition to 11 books and numerous commentaries and translations. He also played a pioneering role in excavating and restoring ancient sites, including the university of Nalanda in modern Bihar. He was also an expert in numismatics, and his discovery of several coins of the Maurya and Gupta periods led to his being the first Indian to be invited to speak at the Royal Asiatic Society of London in 1931.

He was twice elected president of the Numismatic Society of India, and was awarded the degree of Doctor of Philosophy (Honoris Causa) by Benares Hindu University and Patna University.

Jayaswal was the grandfather of Oxford economist Sanjaya Lall.

== Influence on Ramdhari Singh 'Dinkar' ==
Jayaswal loved Ramdhari Singh 'Dinkar' like a son and assisted him during the early days of his poetic career. Jayaswal's death in 1937 was a blow to the young poet. Much later, he wrote in Kalpna, a magazine published from Hyderabad:

It was a good thing that Jaiswalji was my first admirer. Now, when I have savoured the love and encouragement of the Sun, Moon, Varun, Kuber, Indra, Brihaspati, Shachi and Brahmani, it is clear that none of them was like Jaiswalji. As I heard the news of his death, the world became a dark place for me. I did not know what to do."

Actually Jaiswalji was the first person to appreciate the historical sense in the poetry of Dinkar.

== K. P. Jayaswal Research Institute ==
The K. P. Jayaswal Research Institute in Patna was established by the Government of Bihar in 1950 with the object of promoting "historical research, archaeological excavation and investigations and publication of works of permanent value to scholars". The institute is currently based out of Patna Museum.
