= Bijolia =

Bijolia Vindhyavali Bijoliya Kalan
- Census town
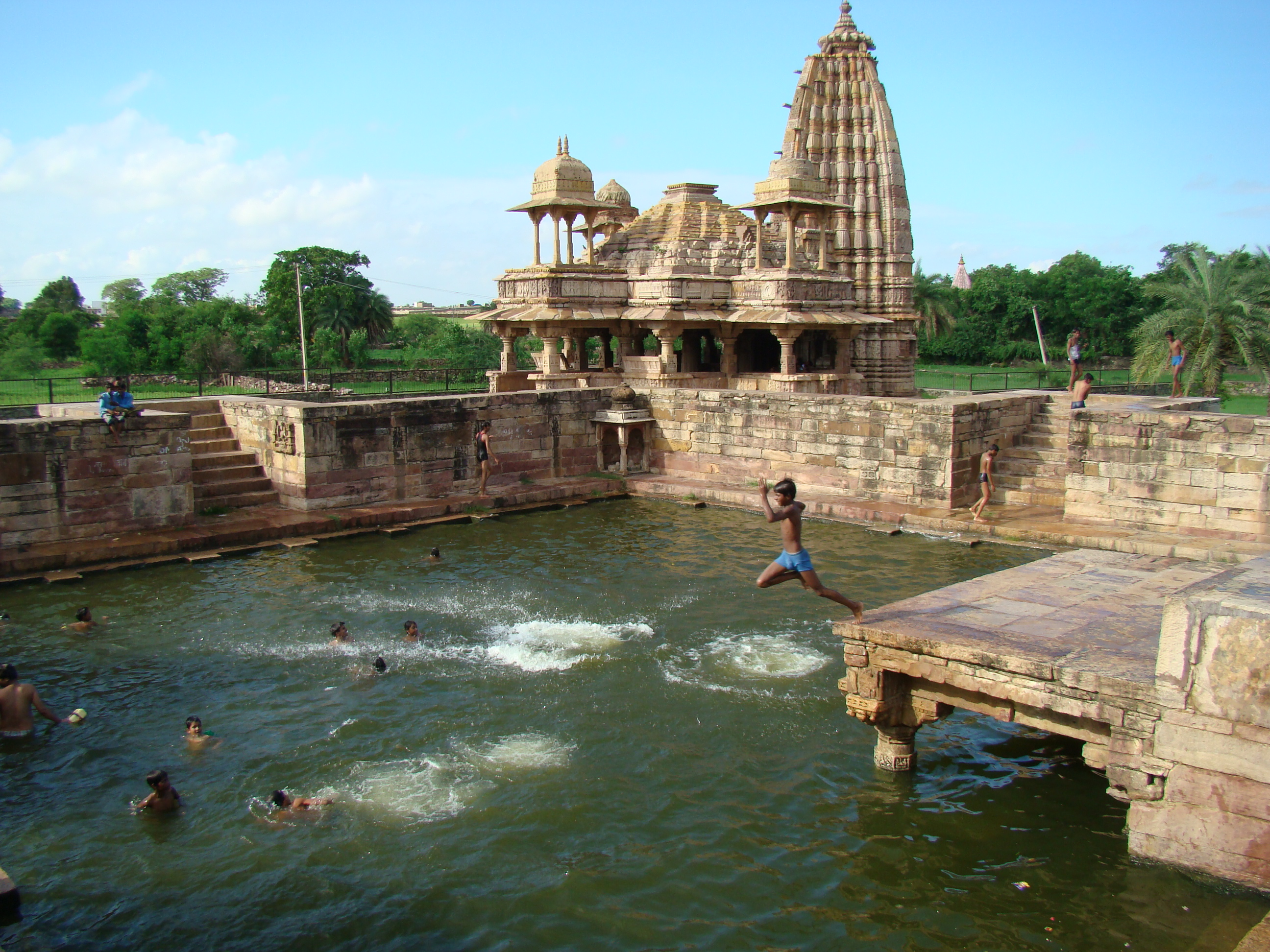
- Bijolia Mandakini temple (Shiva temple)

- Location in Rajasthan, India
- Coordinates: 25.164°N 75.325°E
- Country: India
- State: Rajasthan
- District: Bhilwara

Government
  - Type: Indian Government
  - Body: Nagar Palika
- Elevation: 512 m (1,680 ft)

Population (2001)
  - Total: 12,384

Languages
  - Official: Hindi
- Time zone: UTC+5:30 (IST)
- Postal code: 311602
- Vehicle registration: RJ-06

Bijoliya is a census town in Bhilwara district in the state of Rajasthan, India and is surrounded by nature and waterfalls and is famous for Tapodaya Teerth Kshetra and Mandakini Temple.

== Geography ==
Bijoliya Kalan is located at 25°9′50″N 75°19′30″E. It has an average elevation of 512 m (1,680 ft) The town is in the southeast of Bhilwara. It is close to the borders of the District Bundi. It is walled with two gates (north and south) and situated on a plateau called the Uparmal.

Distance from various cities: 50 km from Bundi on the Bundi-Chittauragarh road, 70 km from Kota on NH 27, 85 km from Bhilwara on Bhilwara-Kota national highway via NH 758 and NH 27.

== Demographics ==
As of 2001 India census, Beejoliya Kalan had a population of 12,384. Males constitute 52% of the population and females 48%. Beejoliya Kalan has an average literacy rate of 64%, higher than the national average of 59.5%; with 59% of the males and 41% of females literate. 15% of the population is under 6 years of age.

== Tourism ==
The Hindu god Shiva's temple is at Tiliswa Mahadev Temple at the Rajasthan-Madhya Pradesh border.

The fort, Mandakini temple and Shree Digambar Jain Parshwanath Atishaya Teerthkhshetra are the main attractions. The fort is on Bundi Chttaurgarh road. A high paved courtyard on the side of the fort has a large temple of Shiva. A carved archway leads to the temple that has a fine image of Hindu god Ganesh. The Shiva temple is called Hajaresvara Mahadeva temple. It has a high linga surrounded by hundreds of small lingas and hence called Hajaresvara or Sahastralinga. Near by Mandakani Kund is a holy water tank. Other attractions are five Jain temples dedicated to Paraswnath and the remains of a palace and two rock inscriptions.

Protected Monuments By Archaeological Survey of India in Rajasthan contains three sites from Bijolia village:

- Mahakalsaz and two other temples
- Rock Inscription (12th century) in Bijolian Parshwanath Jain temple
- Rock Inscription of the Chauhan Dynasty
- Waterfalls include Menal, Bhadak (Choti Bijolia, Avi Jain), Bhimlat, Bhadkiya, etc.

== Bijolia rock inscription ==
The Bijolia inscription dating back V.S. 1226 (1170 AD), issued during the reign of the Chahamana king Someshvara, is very important because it throws a new light on the early history of the Chahamana dynasty. It has thirty lines and ninety verses. In various verses praise has been offered to Rishabhnatha, the first Jain Tirthankara, Shantinatha (16th Tirthankara), Parshvanatha (23rd Tirthankara) and Mahavira, 24th and last Tirthankara. It mentions the destruction of some small Chaulukya cities by the Someshvara's predecessor Vigraharaja IV.

== Shri Digambar Jain Parshwanath Atishay Kshetra ==
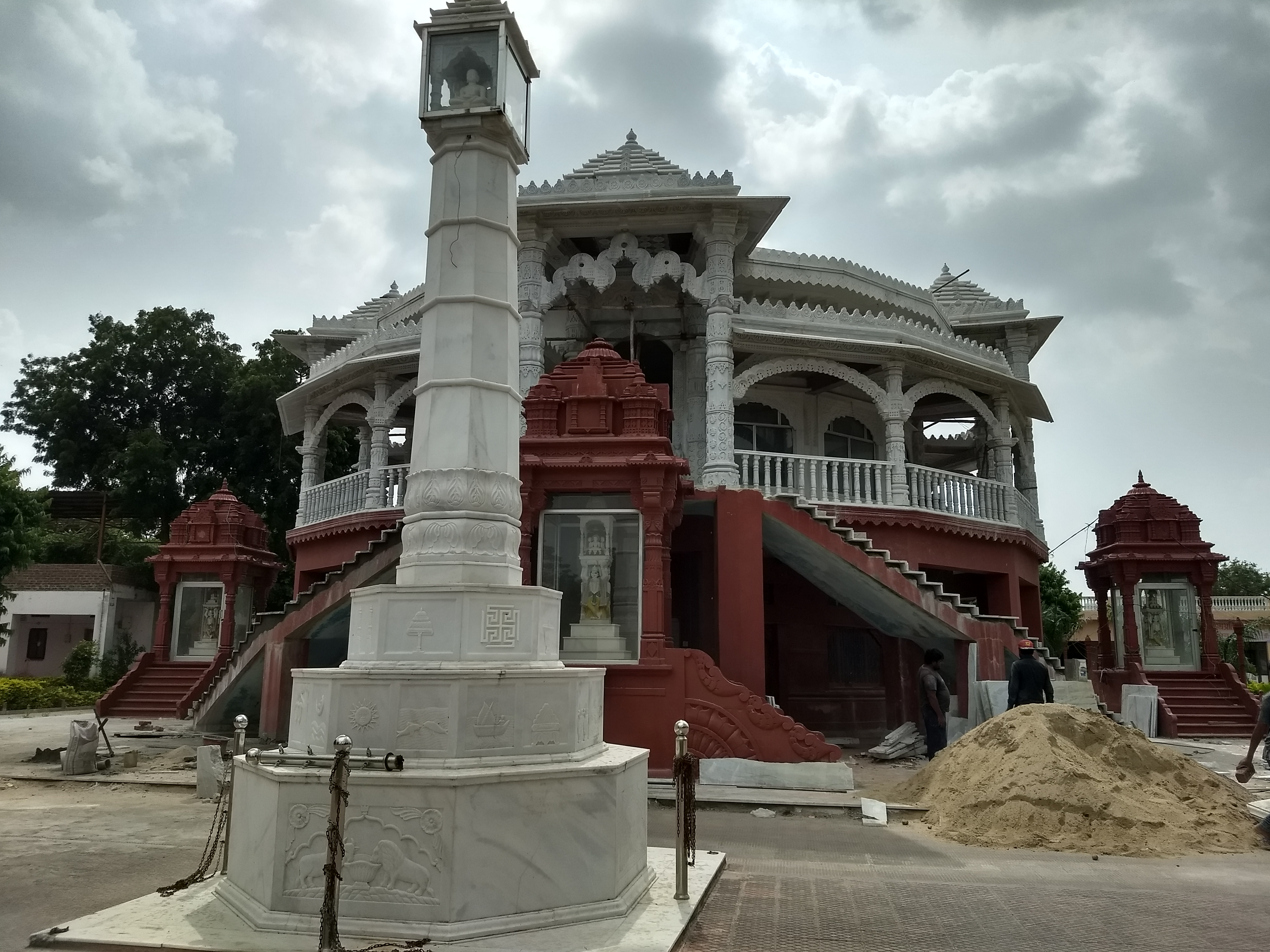
Bijolia Jain temple

The Jain temples, situated about 1.5 km of the south east were built by Mahajan Lala in the time of the Chahamana king Someshvara in 1170 AD. One of them is considered sacred containing a complete small model of a temple inside. The rock inscriptions have both been dated to 1170 AD. This temple is dedicated to Teerthankar Parshvanath of Jain religion. Bijoliya Teerth Kshetra is supposed to be the place of penance (Tapa Bhumi) of god Parsvanath, place of provocation (Upsarg Bhumi) by Kamattha (Enemy of Parsvanath since previous lives) and place of achieving Kevala gyan (omniscience) and first site of Samavasarana of Parsvanath. Some of petroglyphs are available here. This place is supposed to be old more than 2750 years, as is clear by petroglyphs. The Kshetra is about 2 km ahead in south – east of Bijoliya Town.

In 1169 (V.S. 1226) a businessman of Ujjain City Shri Lolark came here during his pilgrimage, saw a dream in night and learned of the ancient idol of Parsvanath. According to dream in the next morning he dug the place near a pond and thus a magnificent ancient idol of Parsvanath appeared, some other idols of goddess Ambika, Padmawati, and Kshetrapal were also found.

This temple was completed in 1169 (V.S. 1226) and these idols were installed in this temple on the day Falgun Krishna 3, Thursday of V.S. 1226. This is a Panchayati Mandir (Temple) surrounded by a rampart.

According to Peter Flügel, the Undeshvar Shiva temple of Bijolia was originally a Śvētāmbara temple based on carvings of prominent Jain figures in the temple exterior.

== Transport links ==
=== By air ===
The nearest airport is Udaipur which is about 214 km away from Bijoliya and (as of july 2026) and gets 1,650,607 annual passengers.

=== By road ===
Bijoliya is situated on National Highway No. 27. Direct buses are available from Udaipur, Chittorgarh (105 km), Kota (69 km), Indore, Neemuch, etc.

=== By train ===
The nearest railway station is "Upermal Railway Station" 8 km from the city.

== Attractions ==
1. The oldest Temple of Bijolia "Mandakini Temple"
2. Rock Inscriptions
3. Old City Fortification Wall
3. Hajaresvara temple
4. Paraswanath temple
5. Bani Ke Balaji
6. Maa Vindhyavasini Shaktipith
