= Vijay Singh Pathik =

Indian revolutionary (1882-1954)

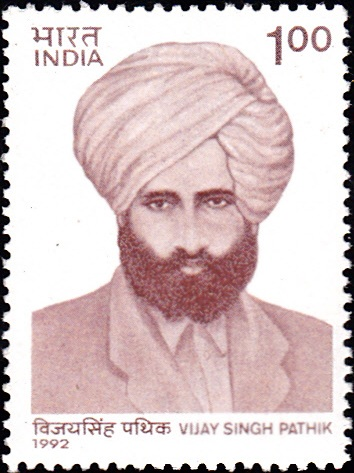
- Vijay Singh Pathik on a 1992 stamp of India
- Born: Bhoop Singh Gurjar; Village Guthawali, Bulandshahr, Uttar Pradesh, India in 1882
- Died: Mathura in 1954
- Other name: Rashtriya Pathik
- Organization: Rajasthan Sewa Sangh
- Known for: Indian Freedom Fighter , Journalist,
- Movement: Bijolia movement , Begun farmer's movement
- Spouse: Janki Devi "Pathik"
- Website: https://www.vijaysinghpathik.org

Vijay Singh Pathik (also spelled Bijaya Singh Pathik; born Bhoop Singh; 1882–1954), popularly known as Rashtriya Pathik and frequently referred to in official correspondence by his signature initials B.S. Pathik, was an Indian revolutionary. He was among the first Indian revolutionaries who lit the torch of freedom movement against British rule. Much before Mohandas K. Gandhi initiated the Satyagrah movement, Pathik experimented during the Bijolia’s Kisan agitation. After being implicated in the Lahore conspiracy case in 1915, he changed his name to Vijay Singh Pathik. His grandfather's sacrifice in the struggle of 1857 in Bulandshahr district, affected him deeply to be freedom fighter.

== Early life ==
Pathik was born in 1882 in Guthawali village, Bulandshahar district in a Gurjar family. His father had taken active part in the Sepoy Mutiny of 1857 and was arrested multiple times. Pathik's Grand Father was Inder Singh Gurjar, who was Dewan of Malagarh Riyasat and was killed while fighting against the British. While, his birth name was Bhoop Singh Gurjar, but he changed it to "Vijay Singh Pathik" after being implicated in the Lahore Conspiracy Case in 1915.

== Bijoliya Kisaan Andolan ==
He joined revolutionary organisation in his teenage and took active part against British rule in India. Pathikji’s non-cooperation movement was so successful that Lokmanya Tilak wrote a letter to Maharana Fateh Singh to meet the demand of the Bijoliya agitators. Mahatma Gandhi sent his secretary Mahadev Desai to study the movement. It was Pathik who fought for the cause of united Rajasthan and had taken up the issue with Prime Minister Jawaharlal Nehru and Sardar Patel. He was jailed for having led the Kisan agitation in Bijoliya and kept at special jail created in the Tehsil building of Todgarh. The Kisan Panchayat, Mahila Mandal and Yuvak Mandal invited Pathik to come and lead them.

Pathik was a freedom fighter. As author Indira Vyas said, "He would prefer to end his life rather than to bow down the flag. He also wrote the famous flag song which was very popular during that period."

== Smt. Janki Devi "Pathik" ==
Smt. Janki Devi was a freedom fighter and the wife of Vijay Singh Pathik, the leader of the Bijolia peasant movement. Her life was marked by her transition from a private citizen to an active participant in the Indian independence struggle.

- Marriage: Janki Devi married Vijay Singh Pathik on 24 February 1930. Following their marriage, she immediately entered a life characterized by the struggles and rigors of the political activist movement.
- Political Activism: Drawing inspiration from her husband's resilience, she joined the freedom struggle and became a vocal opponent of the colonial and feudal oppression of the era. She played a significant role in public awakening and mobilizing local populations against atrocities.
- Later Years and Legacy: Following the height of the peasant movements, she resided in Mathura. She dedicated her later life to continuing the "creative works" (social reforms and educational initiatives) established by Pathik ji, ensuring the continuity of his social mission.

=== In popular culture ===
In contemporary regional literature, such as the works of Bhanwarlal Swarnkar, her support is often noted alongside Pathik’s introduction of Satyagraha and the Vande Mataram mantra to the suffering peasantry of the Mewar region.

== Writer and poet ==
Being Indian Revolutionary and Satyagrahi, he was also a very well known Hindi poet, writer and journalist. He was the editor of Rajasthan Kesari and Naveen Rajasthan. He also started his own independent Hindi weekly, the Rajasthan Sandesh and the Nav Sandesh from Ajmer.

He expressed his views through Tarun Rajasthan, Hindi weekly too. He popularly had known as Rashtriya Pathik.

As writer also he made impact through some of his well-known books -Ajay Meru ( novel), Pathik Pramod (collection of stories), Pathikji ke Jail ke Patra, Pathik ki Kavitaon Ka Sangrah etc. He was also appointed as the President of the Rajputana and Madhya Bharat Provincial Congress. Mahatma Gandhi said about him that Pathik is a worker, others are talkers. Pathik is a soldier, brave and impetuous...

== Death and legacy ==
Pathik died in General Ganj, Mathura at his own house where a road named Vijay Singh Pathik Marg . The Government of India issued a postage stamp to pay tribute to him. The Vijay Singh Pathik Smriti Sansthan chronicles the contributions of Vijay Singh Pathik.

Vijay Singh Pathik Government College, Kairana (Shamli)

Veer Vijay Singh Pathik Gurjar Chowk in Loni, Ghaziabad.

Veer Vijay Singh Pathik Gurjar Chowk Madanpur Khadar, New Delhi.
