= Tumsar Road Junction railway station =

Railway Station in Maharashtra, India

Tumsar Road Junction
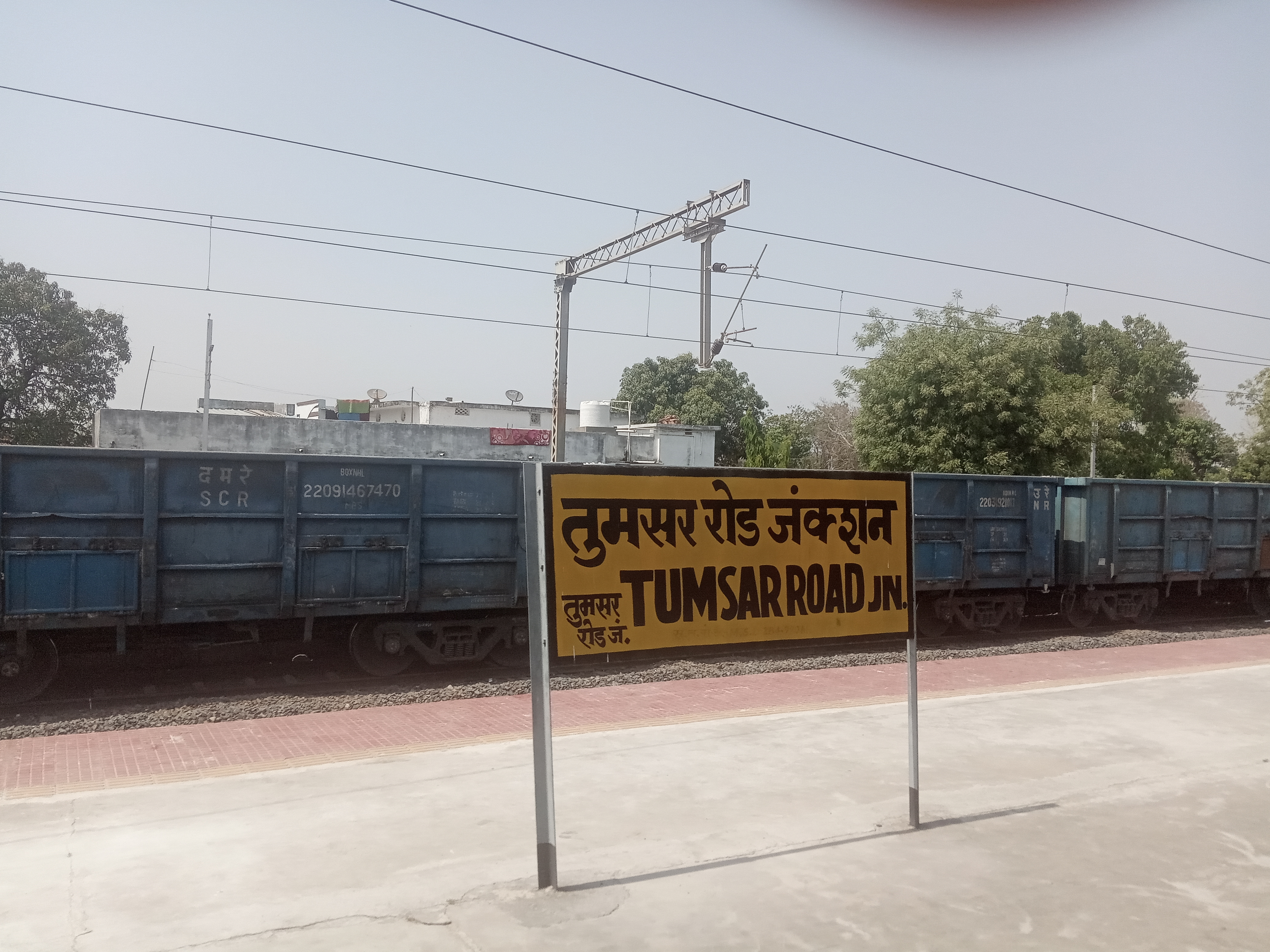
- Tumsar Road Junction railway station

General information
- Location: Dewhadi, Bhandara, Maharashtra 441913; India
- Coordinates: 21.3422°N 79.7516°E
- Elevation: 266 metres (873 ft)
- System: Indian Railways junction station
- Owner: Indian Railways
- Operator: South East Central Railway zone
- Lines: Bilaspur–Nagpur section, Howrah–Nagpur–Mumbai line
- Platforms: 5
- Tracks: 7 broad gauge 1,676 mm (5 ft 6 in)

Construction
- Structure type: Standard at ground
- Parking: Available
- Cycle facilities: Available

Other information
- Status: Functioning
- Station code: TMR
- Zone(s): South East Central Railway zone
- Division(s): Nagpur SEC

History
- Electrified: 1990–91

Passengers
- 7000

Services
Preceding station	Indian Railways	Following station
Mundikota towards ?	South East Central Railway zone Bilaspur–Nagpur section of Howrah–Nagpur–Mumbai line	Koka towards ?
Terminus	South East Central Railway zone Tumsar Road–Tirodi branch line on Bilaspur–Nagpur section of Howrah–Nagpur–Mumbai line	Tumsar Town towards ?
Location
- Location within Maharashtra Location within India

Tumsar Road Junction railway station (station code:- TMR) serves Tumsar City and the surrounding area in Bhandara district in Maharashtra, India. The station consists of five platforms. The platforms are not well sheltered. It lacks many facilities including water and sanitation.

Tumsar Road is five kilometres (3.1 mi) from the town on the Howrah–Nagpur–Mumbai line. The Tumsar Town is another railway station is located on Tirodi line.

== Trains ==
- Tirodi–Tumar Road DEMU
- Maharashtra Express
- Shalimar Express
- Solapur–Gondia Maharashtra Express Slip
- Shivnath Express
- Chhattisgarh Express
- Gevra Road–Nagpur Shivnath Express
- Itwari–Gondia MEMU
- Itwari–Tirodi Passenger
- Itwari–Tatanagar Passenger
- Itwari–Raipur Passenger
- Tirodi–Tumar Road Passenger
- Gondia–Tumar Road Passenger
- Tirunelveli–Bilaspur Express
- Raigarh–H.Nizamuddin Gondwana Express
- Samata Express
- Vidarbha Express
- Azad Hind Express
- Howrah–Ahmedabad Superfast Express
- Howrah Mumbai Mail (via Nagpur)
- Korba Express
- Bilaspur–Nagpur Intercity Express

== Electrification ==
The entire main line is electrified. The Gondia–Bhandara Road section was electrified in 1990–91. and Tumsar Road station is located between Bhandara Road–Gondia section of electrification.
