= Mundikota railway station =

Railway Station in Maharashtra, India

General information
- Location: Mundikota, Gondia district, Maharashtra 441911; India
- Coordinates: 21.3730°N 79.8351°E
- Elevation: 267 metres (876 ft)
- System: Indian Railways station
- Owner: Indian Railways
- Operator: South East Central Railway zone
- Lines: Bilaspur–Nagpur section Howrah–Nagpur–Mumbai line
- Platforms: 2
- Tracks: 5 ft 6 in (1,676 mm) broad gauge

Construction
- Structure type: At ground
- Parking: Available
- Cycle facilities: Available

Other information
- Status: Functioning
- Station code: MNU
- Zone(s): South East Central Railway zone
- Division(s): Nagpur

History
- Electrified: 1990–91

Services
Preceding station	Indian Railways	Following station
Tirora towards ?	South East Central Railway zone Bilaspur–Nagpur section of Howrah–Nagpur–Mumbai line	Tumsar Road Junction towards ?
Location

Mundikota railway station serves Mundikota and surrounding villages in Bhandara District and Gondia district in Maharashtra, India.

== Electrification ==
The entire main line is electrified. The Gondia–Bhandara Road section was electrified in 1990–91. and Mundikota is lying between Bhandara Road–Gondia section of electrification.
