= Pravarasena II =

5th-century ruler of the Indian Vakataka dynasty

- Mahārāja
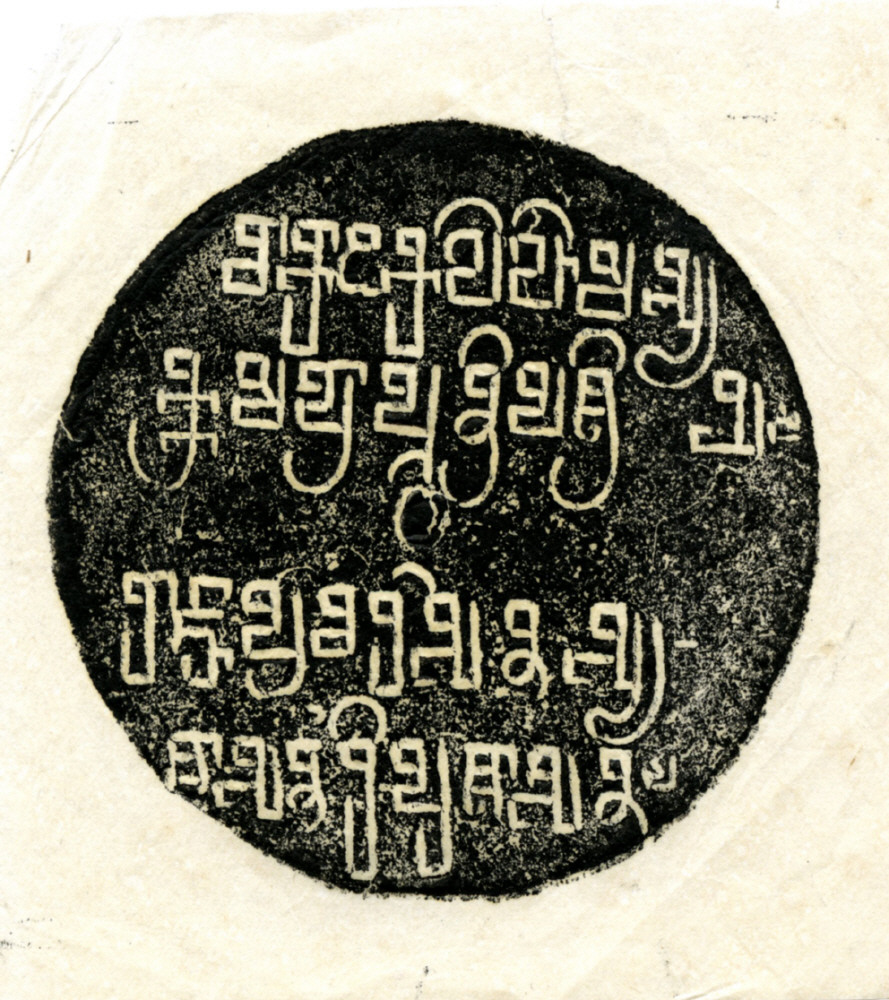
- The royal seal of Pravarasena II attached to the Tirodi plates, dated to his 23rd regnal year. The legend on the seal reads: "(This is) the enemy-chastising command of Pravarasēna, the ornament of the Vākāṭakas, who has attained royal fortune by inheritance."

Vakataka king of Nandivardhana-Pravarapura
- Reign: c. 420 – 455 CE
- Predecessor: Damodarasena
- Successor: Narendrasena
- Spouse: Ajnakabhattarika
- House: Vakataka
- Father: Rudrasena II
- Mother: Prabhavatigupta

Pravarasena II (r. c. 420 – 455 CE) was a ruler of the Nandivardhana-Pravarapura branch of the Vakataka dynasty. He was the son of Rudrasena II and Prabhavatigupta, the daughter of the Gupta emperor Chandragupta II. He succeeded his brother Damodarasena as Maharaja. Pravarasena's reign seems to have been mostly peaceful and prosperous, and is noted for an efflorescence of religious patronage.

== Chronology ==
That all of Pravarasena's extant records are dated in terms of regnal years (rather than any calendar era), the precise era of Pravarasena's reign remains disputed. The only record that provides a firm chronological basis for Vakataka dynastic history is the Hisse-Borala stone inscription of Devasena, a ruler of the Vatsagulma branch, which contains a precise calendar date of year 380 of the Saka era (corresponding to 457/58 CE). Due to the absence of any earlier records that can be precisely dated, different historians have proposed differing dates for Pravarasena's reign, though it is widely agreed that he had a fairly long reign of over three decades and that he ruled mainly in the first half of the fifth century. The following are some recently proposed dates for the reign of Pravarasena II:

- c. 420 – 455 according to Ajay Mitra Shastri.
- c. 422 – 457 according to Hans Bakker.
- c. 419 – 455 according to Hermann Kulke.
- c. 410 – 445 according to Walter Spink.

== Overview of reign ==
Map of present-day Indian districts (highlighted in purple) where charters of Pravarasena II have been found, or which contain place-names referenced in Pravarasena's charters.

The largest number of Vakataka inscriptions belong to Pravarasena's reign. Pravarasena's early charters were issued from the old Vakataka capital of Nandivardhana, but the later charters were issued from a city called Pravarapura which was apparently founded by and named after him. Earlier historians tended to identify Pravarapura with Paunar in the Wardha district of northeast Maharashtra, but more recent archaeological discoveries strongly suggest that the site is to be identified with an extensive settlement found near Mansar in Nagpur district. The place-names provided in Pravarasena's numerous charters indicate that, at the very least, his kingdom extended over the modern districts of Wardha, Nagpur, Amravati and Bhandara (including the more recently-created Gondia district) in Maharashtra, and the districts of Betul, Chhindwara and Balaghat in Madhya Pradesh.

The Vakataka dynasty entered into matrimonial alliances to maintain its influence and security. Pravarasena married his son, Crown Prince Narendrasena, to a "daughter of a king of Kuntala" named Ajjhitabhattarika. The identity of this princess is not certain, but she is often considered to be a daughter of the Kadamba king Kakusthavarman, who is known to have married off his daughters to several prominent royal families. This marriage secured the southern border of the Vakataka dominions, including that of the Vatsagulma branch who were traditional enemies of Kuntala. Pravarasena's own wife was a woman named Ajnakabhattarika, who may have also come from an illustrious lineage and was possibly the mother of Crown Prince Narendrasena. It is also known that a Gupta prince named Ghatotkachagupta, the viceroy of Vidisha, was married to a Vakataka princess who seems to have been Pravarasena's sister.

Pravarasena's reign appears to have been quite peaceful on the whole, as neither his own records nor those of his successors refer to any military exploits of the king. However, in his twenty-third regnal year, Pravarasena had entered into the territory of the Gupta empire with his army, as he issued an inscription while encamped at Tripuri (located near present-day Jabalpur) on the northern bank of the Narmada River. It is not clear what military objectives, if any, Pravarasena had during this excursion. The Ramtek Kevala Narasimha temple inscription states that following the death of Ghatotkachagupta, the brother of his widow had brought her back home by force. Hans Bakker interprets this to mean that Pravarasena had invaded the Gupta dominions to bring back his sister, possibly due to a conflict within the Gupta empire in which Ghatotkachagupta, supported by the Vakatakas and the Nagas, had been eliminated by his upstart nephew Skandagupta.

== Administration ==
Pravarasena's administration was characterized by the appointment of officials styled Senapati as either viceroys or as a kind of "high commissioner" to oversee subordinate states within the Vakataka realm. The names of several Senapatis such as Chitravarman, Namidasa, Katyayana, and Bappudeva are known from inscriptions. The Senapati Namidasa was placed in charge of an administrative division known as Arammi-rajya, and the same figure seems to have also been a rajyadhikrita or "chief minister" of Pravarasena.

The Vakataka kingdom contained a number of smaller principalities which were ruled by local feudatory dynasties. These feudatories had no power to issue land grants without the permission of the sovereign Vakataka ruler. A man named Kondaraja, son of Shatrughnaraja, features as an important feudatory ruler of the Bhojakata-rajya in Vidarbha. Kondaraja, who was termed as a rajan (lit. "king", but evidently meaning a subordinate chief in this context).

== Religious and cultural works ==
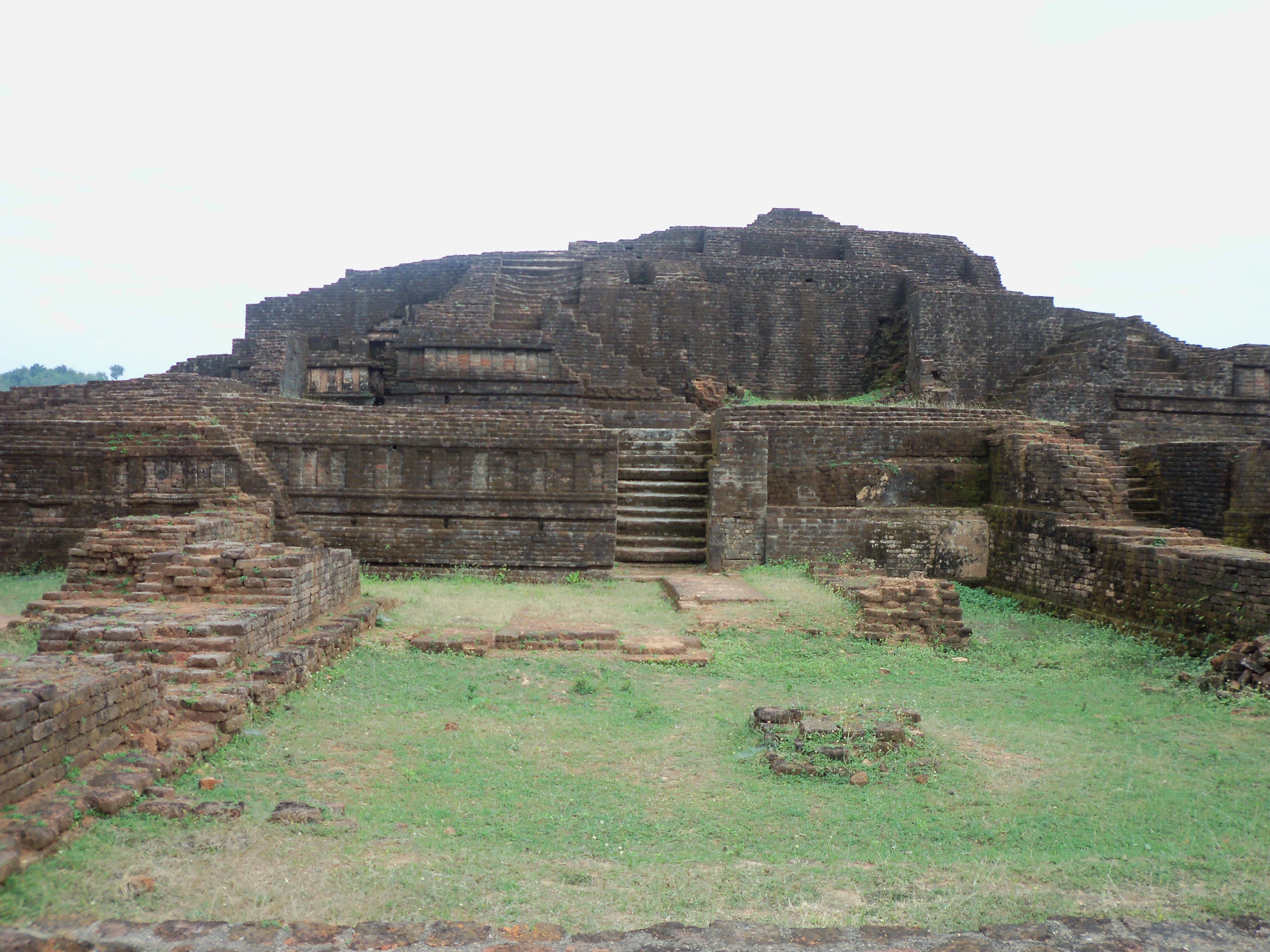
A large brick temple at Mansar, India, identified by some scholars with the Pravareshwara temple complex founded by Pravarasena II.

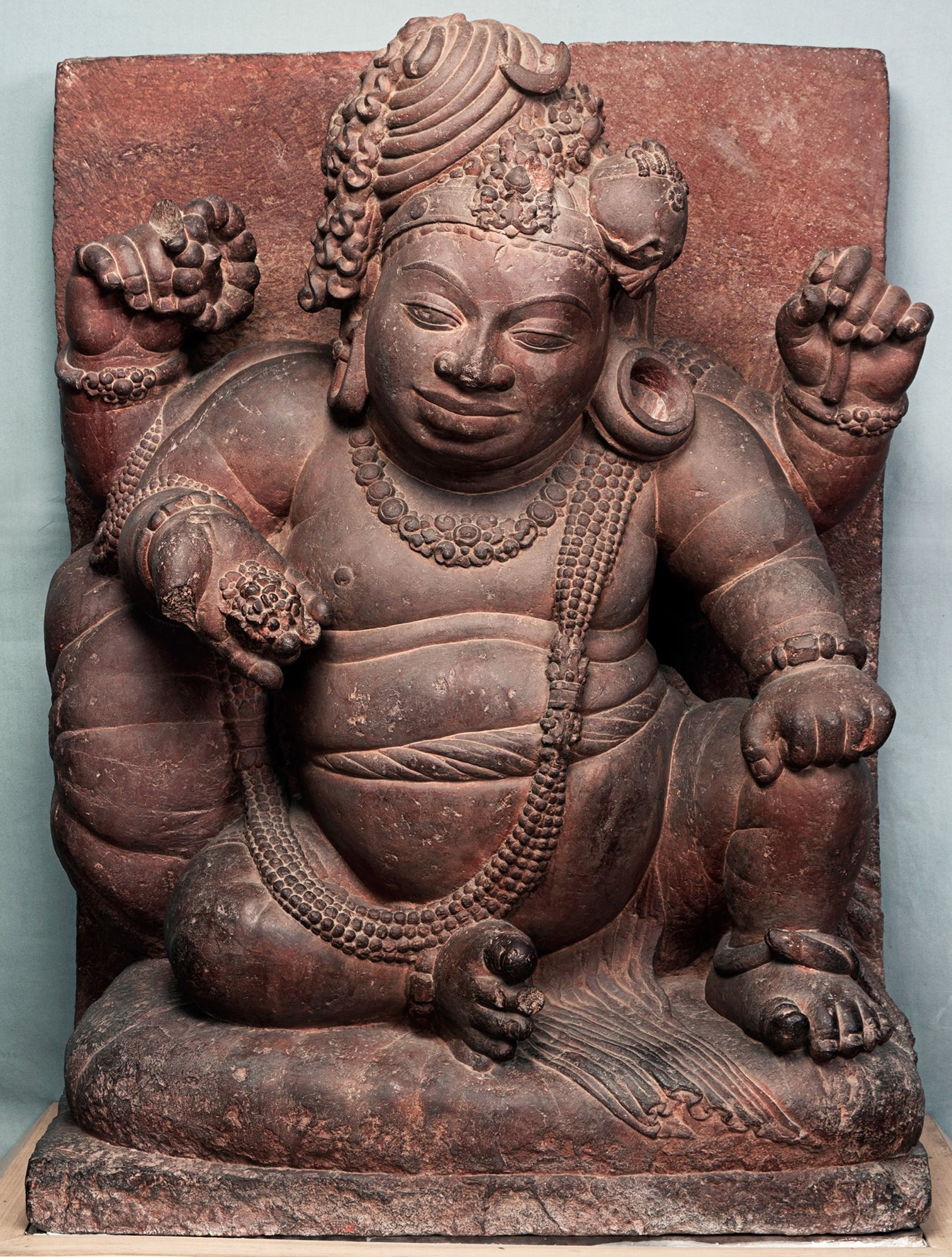
An image of Shiva from Mansar, currently housed in the National Museum, New Delhi. The image was likely produced during the reign of Pravarasena II, who was known to be a devout Shaivite.

Unlike his parents who were Vaishnavites, Pravarasena was an ardent Shaivite who was known throughout his long reign as Paramamaheshwara, meaning a devout worshipper of Maheshwara or Shiva. This return to the older religious tradition of the Vakatakas likely indicates that Pravarasena was no longer under the heavy influence of the Vaishnavite Guptas. Pravarasena boasted that he had established the conditions of the Kritayuga (Golden Age) on earth by the grace of Shiva.

Pravarasena's influential mother Prabhavatigupta remained active in public life for much of his reign. As a devout Vaishnavite, Prabhavatigupta made a number of religious grants and does not seen to have been dissuaded by her son's Shaivite tendencies. She was particularly attached to her tutelary deity of Ramagirisvamin on the hill at Ramtek. While most of Pravarasena's religious donations aimed at increasing the merit, life, power, victory, and rule of the king himself, in his Patna Museum Plate all the religious merit is said to accrue to the Queen Mother, i.e. Prabhavatigupta. In his twenty-third regnal year, Pravarasena made a grant for the spiritual welfare of both his mother and himself, in this life and the next.

A number of locales emerged during the reign of Pravarasena as important religious centers. The sacred hill compound at Ramagiri, located north of Nandivardhana, had developed into a sort of official state sanctuary dedicated to Vishnu and his avatars, primarily due to the patronage of Prabhavatigupta. The site of Mansar, located about five kilometers west of Ramagiri, contains a brick temple that has been attributed to Pravarasena. A Shiva image of extraordinary quality was found at the site, indicating that it may have been a major Shaivite center. The Mansar temple complex may be identical to the Pravareshwara temple complex, which was founded by Pravarasena and which served as an important state sanctuary of the Vakataka kingdom, perhaps meant to be a Shaivite equivalent of the Ramagiri complex. A place known as Narattangavari also seems to have developed into an important religious center, as Pravarasena probably went on pilgrimage to the site and is known to have issued his Tirodi grant from there which is mentioned in Tirodi copper plates. He also made Ilichpur grants to brahmins which are mentioned in Chamak copper plates.

Patronage of religious establishments, temples, and brahmins constituted an important aspect of Vakataka kingship. The endowment of brahmins with tax free land on the periphery of the kingdom may have served to spread and reinforce the dharmic religious and social order. During Pravarasena's reign, such notions of dharmic kingship seem to have percolated down to the local feudatory rulers as well. The feudatory Kondaraja proved his worth to Pravarasena, his sovereign, by granting land to one thousand brahmins. Another feudatory ruler named Narayanaraja requested a donation be made to a religious feeding house or sattra.

Pravarasena has often been credited with authoring a Maharashtri Prakrit poem named Setubandha or Ravanavaho which details the exploits of Rama in Lanka against the demon-king Ravana. Due to the poem's Vaishnavite themes (as Rama was regarded to be an avatar of Vishnu) in contrast to Pravarasena's own avowed Shaivism. However, Pravarasena appears to have had quite a good relationship with his Vaishnavite mother and Vaishnavite sites continued to flourish during his reign, suggesting that Pravarasena may have had a more ecumenical approach to religion despite his own marked preference for worshipping Shiva. At the time, there was perhaps not much bigotry associated with the divisions Shaivite and Vaishnavite.

== Final days and succession ==
The last of Pravarasena's surviving inscriptions was issued in his thirty-second regnal year, which was probably sometime in the 450s. In 454/55 there seems to have been instability and infighting in the lands north of the Vakataka kingdom, possibly due to a Gupta succession crisis following the death of Kumaragupta. Bakker suggests that Pravarasena may have invaded the Gupta territories during this time to establish his authority in the region to the north of the Narmada, and died soon thereafter. Following Pravarasena's death a succession struggle may have broken out in the Vakataka realm itself, from which Crown Prince Narendrasena ultimately emerged victorious and succeeded his father as Maharaja.

== See also ==
- History of Mansar
