= Gender history =

Sub-field of history and gender studies

Gender history is a sub-field of history and gender studies, which looks at the past from the perspective of gender. It is in many ways, an outgrowth of women's history. The discipline considers in what ways historical events and periodization impact women differently from men. For instance, in an influential article in 1977, "Did Women have a Renaissance?", Joan Kelly questioned whether the notion of a Renaissance was relevant to women. Gender historians are also interested in how gender difference has been perceived and configured at different times and places, usually with the assumption that such differences are socially constructed. These social constructions of gender throughout time are also represented as changes in the expected norms of behavior for those labeled male or female. Those who study gender history note these changes in norms and those performing them over time and interpret what those changes say about the larger social/cultural/political climate.

== Women's historians and gender histories ==
Women's historians and scholars have made the differentiation between the terms "gender" and "sex". Sex was defined to be the biological makeup of an individual, while gender was defined to be the chosen identity of an individual. Natsuki Aruga has argued that the work of women's historians regarding gender has helped to solidify the distinction between gender and sex. Women's studies and feminism form part of the base of gender studies, of which gender history is a sub-field. Kathleen Brown has stated that there is a level of difficulty in determining a distinction between women's and gender studies as there is no singular and overarching definition of what it means to be a woman. This in turn leads to difficulty in determining a distinction between women's and gender histories.

While some historians are hesitant to accept the title of "women's historian", others have taken on the title willingly. Those who have accepted the title tend to place a large emphasis on the study of the welfare state in relation to feminist history and the role that gender has played as an organizational factor of the state. The focus of feminist historians has also drifted to Democratic Party policy and the realm of policy, including pay-equity, which is a part of both social and political history.

== Impact ==
Despite its relatively short life, gender history (and its forerunner women's history) has had a rather significant effect on the general study of history. Since the 1960s, when the initially small field first achieved a measure of acceptance, it has gone through a number of different phases, each with its own challenges and outcomes, but always making an impact of some kind on the historical discipline. Although some of the changes to the study of history have been quite obvious, such as increased numbers of books on famous women or simply the admission of greater numbers of women into the historical profession, other influences are more subtle, even though they may be more politically groundbreaking in the end. By 1970, gender historians turned to documenting ordinary women's expectations, aspirations and status. In the 80s with the rise of the feminist movement, the focus shifted to uncovering women's oppression and discrimination. Nowadays, gender history is more about charting female agency and recognizing female achievements in several fields that were usually dominated by men.

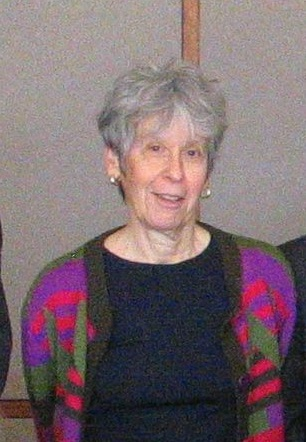
Joan Scott, author of a founding article for the discipline in 1986

=== Within the profession ===
According to historian Joan Scott, conflict occurred between Women's History historians and other historians in a number of ways. In the American Historical Association, when feminists argued that female historians were treated unequally within the field and underrepresented in the association, they were essentially leveling charges of historical negligence by traditional historians. Notions of professionalism were not rejected outright, but they were accused of being biased.

=== Supplementary history ===
According to Scott, the construction of Women's History as "supplementary" to the rest of history had a similar effect. At first glance, a supplement simply adds information which has been missing from the greater story, but as Scott points out, it also questions why the information was left out in the first place. Whenever it is noticed that a woman found to be missing from written history, Women's History first describes her role, second, examines which mechanisms allowed her role to be omitted, and third, asks to what other information these mechanisms were blind.

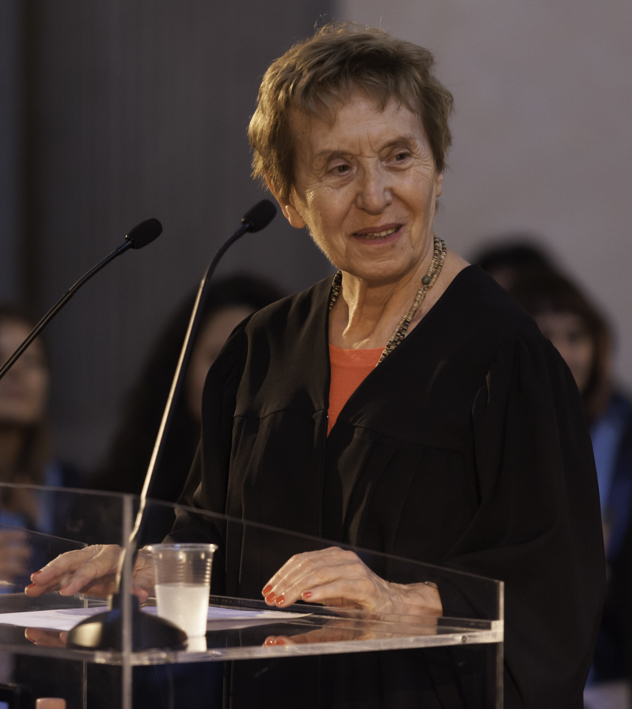
Michelle Perrot, a figure in the emergence of gender history as a discipline in France, here in 2016.

=== Gender theory ===
Finally, the advent of gender theory once again challenged commonly held ideas of the discipline, including those scholars studying Women's History. Post-modern criticism of essentialising socially constructed groups, be they gender groups or otherwise, pointed out the weaknesses in various sorts of history. In the past, historians have attempted to describe the shared experience of large numbers of people, as though these people and their experiences were homogeneous and uniform. Women have multiple identities, influenced by any number of factors including race and class, and any examination of history which conflates their experiences, fails to provide an accurate picture.

== History of masculinity ==
The history of masculinity emerged as a specialty in the 1990s, evidenced by numerous studies of men in groups, and how concepts of masculinity shape their values and behavior. Gail Bederman identified two approaches: one that emerged from women's history and one that ignored it:

Two types of 'men's history' are being written these days. One builds on twenty years of women's history scholarship, analyzing masculinity as part of larger gender and cultural processes. The other ... looks to the past to see how men in early generations understood (and misunderstood) themselves as men. Books of the second type mostly ignore women's history findings and methodology.

== Gender in religion ==
All over the world, religion is formed around a divine, supernatural figure. While the idea of the divine, supernatural figure varies from religion to religion, each one is framed around different concepts of what it means to be male and female. In many religions, women or symbols of female deities are worshipped for their fertility. Furthermore, the religion of a culture usually directly corresponds or is influenced by the culture's gender structure, like the family structures and/or the state. Therefore, the religious structure and the gender structure work together to form and define a culture, creating the defining structures of equality and uniformity.

== Intersectionality ==
In recent years, some historians have emphasized the importance of combining gender with other categories of analysis. Indeed, men and women do not form homogeneous groups and cannot be studied solely in terms of their gender. The notion of intersectionality refers to comparing the various social relationships that affect a person or group of people. Women and men must be understood as individuals who find themselves at the confluence of multiple social forces. Gender, social class, and race are the factors that most frequently intersect, but sexual orientation, religious practices, and other factors can also be included.

== See also ==
- Aspasia, A scholarly journal
- Family history
- Herstory, A term for feminist historiography
- History of feminism
- Legal rights of women in history
- Schlesinger Library, A major collection at Harvard University
- Sex in the American Civil War
- Women in Church history
- Women in combat
- Women in the Middle Ages
- Women's history
  - History of women in the Indian subcontinent
  - History of women in the United Kingdom
  - History of women in the United States
  - Women in World War I
  - Women in World War II
