= Damodarasena =

- Mahārāja

Vakataka king of Nandivardhana-Pravarapura
- Reign: c. 410 - 420 CE
- Predecessor: Prabhavatigupta (regent for Divakarasena)
- Successor: Pravarasena II
- House: Vakataka dynasty
- Father: Rudrasena II
- Mother: Prabhavatigupta

Damodarasena (r. c. 410 – 420 CE) was a ruler of the Nandivardhana-Pravarapura branch of the Vakataka dynasty. He was the son of Rudrasena II and Prabhavatigupta, the daughter of the Gupta emperor Chandragupta II. His father's early death led to Prabhavatigupta ruling as regent for an extended period of time as their sons Divakarasena, Damodarasena, and Pravarasena were all minors. Divakarasena, the Crown Prince, died before ascending the throne and so it was Damodarasena and his brother, Pravarasena II, who became Vakataka kings instead. It is possible that Prabhavatigupta continued to act as regent during part of Damodarasena's reign.

In the past, the status of Damodarasena as a Vakataka ruler was subject to controversy. Some noted historians in the middle of the 20th century, including V.V. Mirashi and A.S. Altekar, thought that Damodarasena and Pravarasena II were actually the same person, with "Pravarasena" simply being a coronation name that Damodarasena assumed after ascending to the throne. However, the seal inscription of the Miregaon plates, discovered in 1982, describes Prabhavatigupta as the "mother of two kings" (i.e. Damodarasena and Pravarasena II) and finally establishes that the two persons were indeed distinct.
