= KWN =

KWN or kwn may refer to:

- KWN, the IATA code for Quinhagak Airport, Alaska, United States
- KWN, the Indian Railways station code for Kachewani railway station, Maharashtra, India
- KWN, the National Rail station code for Kilwinning railway station, North Ayrshire, Scotland
- kwn, the ISO 639-3 code for Kwangali language, Namibia and Angola
- kwn, the British singer-songwriter and rapper
