= History of women in the Indian subcontinent =

The study of women's history in the Indian subcontinent has been a major scholarly and popular field, with many scholarly books and articles, museum exhibits, and courses in schools and universities.

== Ancient and Early Medieval periods ==
Krishna at Goddess Radharani's feet

Women during the Vedic period enjoyed high status with men in all aspects of life. Works by ancient Indian grammarians such as Patanjali and Katyayana suggest that women were educated in the early Vedic period. Rig Vedic verses suggest that women married at a mature age and were probably free to select their own husbands in a practice called swayamvar or through Gandharva marriage. The Rig Veda and Upanishads mention several women sages and seers, notably Gargi Vachaknavi and Maitreyi (c. 7th century BCE).

Originally, women were allowed to undergo initiation and study the Vedas. In the Dharmasutra of Hathras, it is mentioned that:

In Mahabharata, the story of Draupadi's marriage to 5 men is a case in point. This pointed to the fact that polygamy was matched with polyandry during the Vedic era. Women could select their husbands in an assembly called swayamwar. In this practice, the father of the woman would invite all the men and the woman would select one, and marry him while the court watched.

Also, in the Puranas, every God was shown in consort of their wives, Vishnu with Lakshmi and Shiva with Parvati). Idols of god and goddesses were depicted with importance to both genders. Separate temples were set up for goddesses, and within each temple, goddesses were treated and worshipped with as much care and devotion as the gods were. There are also specific practices that endure to this day, in terms of preference of worship.

The book Hindu Female Deities as a resource for contemporary rediscovery of the Goddess by Gross Rita.M, 1989, says:

"According to some scholars the positive constructions of femininity found in goddess imagery and in the related imagery of the virangana or heroic woman have created a cognitive framework, for Hindus to accept and accommodate powerful female figures like "Indira Gandhi and Phoolan Devi, The same would not have been possible in Western religious traditions"

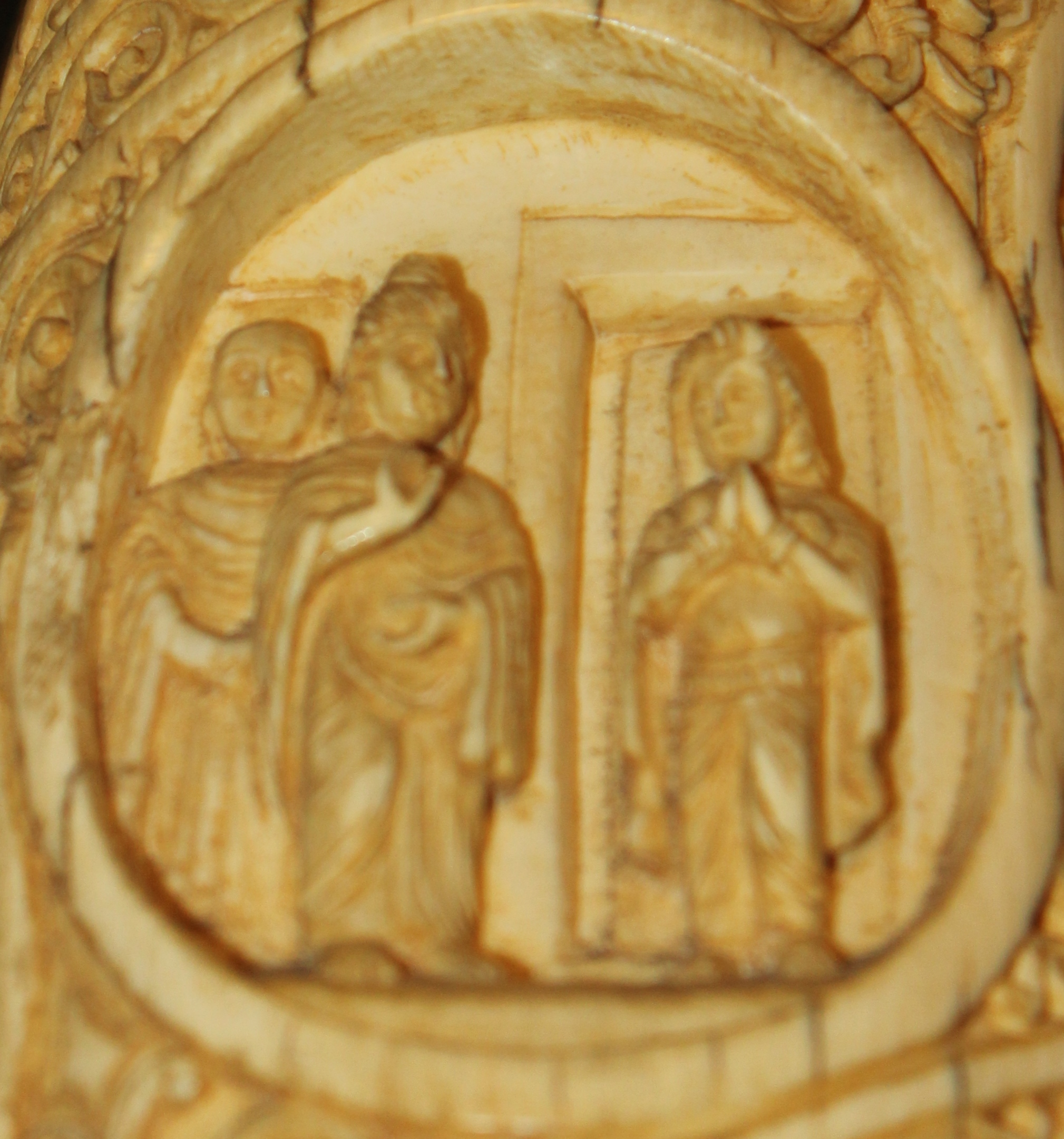
"Amrapali greets Buddha", ivory carving, National Museum, New Delhi. Amrapali was a celebrated nagarvadhu (royal courtesan) of the republic of Vaishali in ancient India.

In the 6th or 5th century BCE, Queen Mṛgāvatī (in Sanskrit), or Migāvatī (in Prakrit) of the Vatsa mahajanapada ruled as regent while her son Udayana was either a minor or held captive by a rival king, and she earned "the admiration of even experienced ministers."

Apastamba sutra (c. 4th century BCE) captures some prevalent ideas of the role of women during the post Vedic ages. The Apastamba Sutra shows the elevated position of women that existed during the 4th century BCE:

A man is not allowed to abandon his wife (A 1.28.19).

He permits daughters to inherit (A 2.14.4). There can be no division of property between a husband and a wife, because they are linked inextricably together and have joint custody of the property (A 2.29.3). Thus, a wife may make gifts and use the family wealth on her own when her husband is away (A 2.12.16–20).

Women are upholders of traditional lore, and Āpastamba tells his audience that they should learn some customs from women (A 2.15.9; 2.29.11).

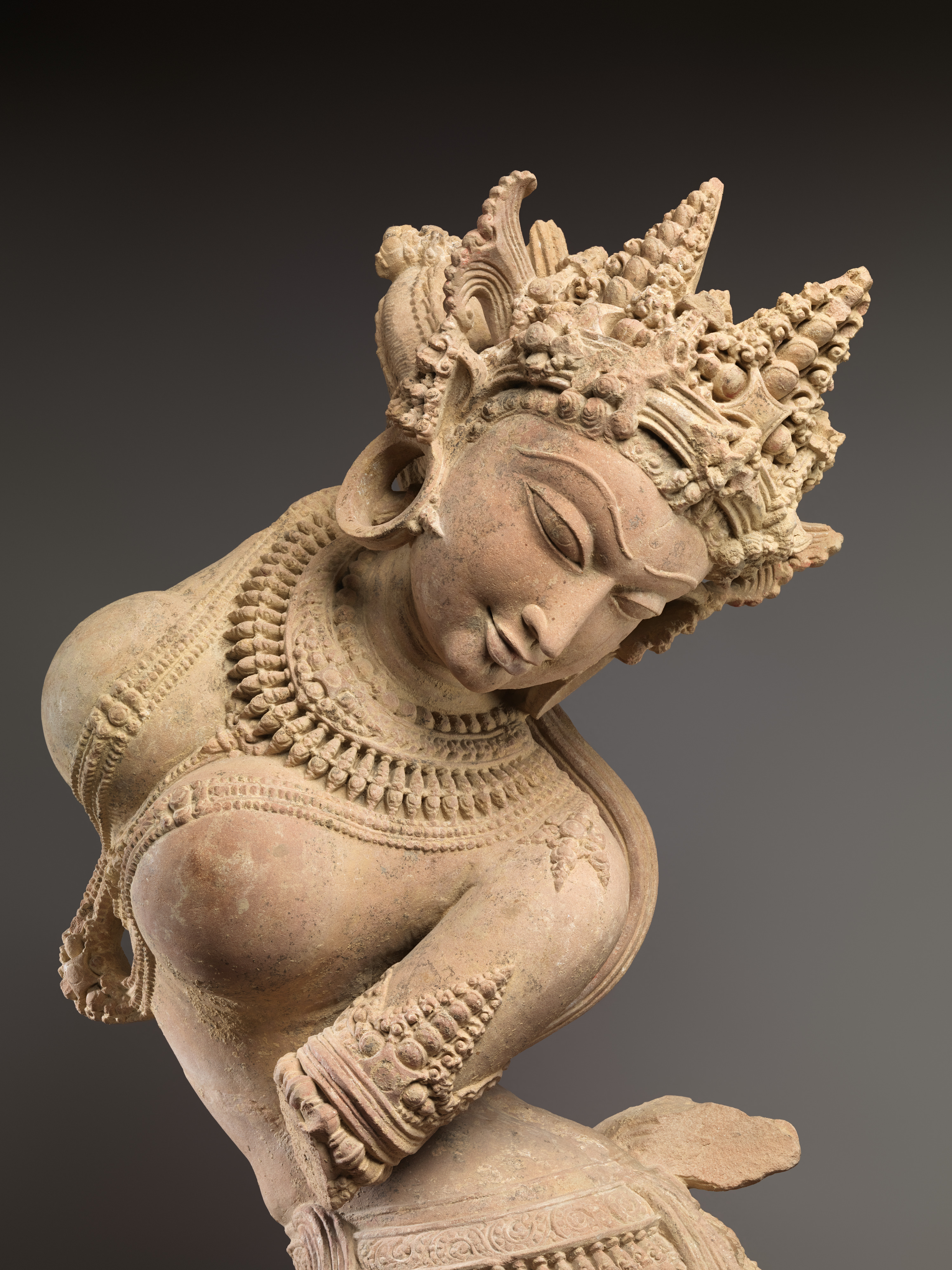
Statue of Dancing Celestial deity (Devada) in Uttar Pradesh, India

In the Gupta period instances are not rare of women participating in an administrative job. Chandragupta I, founder of the Gupta Empire, ruled the kingdom jointly with his queen Kumaradevi. Prabhavatigupta was the daughter of Chandra Gupta II of the Gupta Empire and the wife of Rudrasena II of the Vakataka dynasty, and performed administrative duties in her kingdom. Instances of women of the upper classes extending their phase of activities beyond the domestic circle are provided by the queen and queens regent in Kashmir, Rajasthan, Orissa and Andhra. Institutions were established for co-education. In the work called Amarkosh written in the Gupta era names of the teachers and professors are there and they belonged to the female sex.

In the 2nd century BCE, Queen Nayanika (or Naganika) was the ruler and military commander of the Satavahana Empire of the Deccan region (south-central India). Another early female ruler in South Asia was Queen Anula of Anuradhapura (Sri Lanka, 1st century BCE).

Queen Orrisa assumed regency when her son died in the late ninth century and immediately involved herself in military adventuring. Queen Kurmadevi of Mevad commanded her armies on the battlefield in the late twelfth century. Queen Didda of Kashmir ruled as full sovereign for twenty-two years, and Queen Jawahirabi fought and died at the head of her army.

In Sri Lanka, Queen Sugula led her armies against the southern king, her nephew. When pressed by the royal forces, she guided her forces into the mountains, where she built a number of forts. Sugula held out against the king's army for ten years and is remembered in Sri Lankan history as "Sugula, the rebel queen fearless". Princess Zainab Tari, a member of the Soomra dynasty, ruled over Sindh in the late 11th century as a regent to his brother Shahabuddin Sanghar.

== Late Medieval and Early Modern period ==
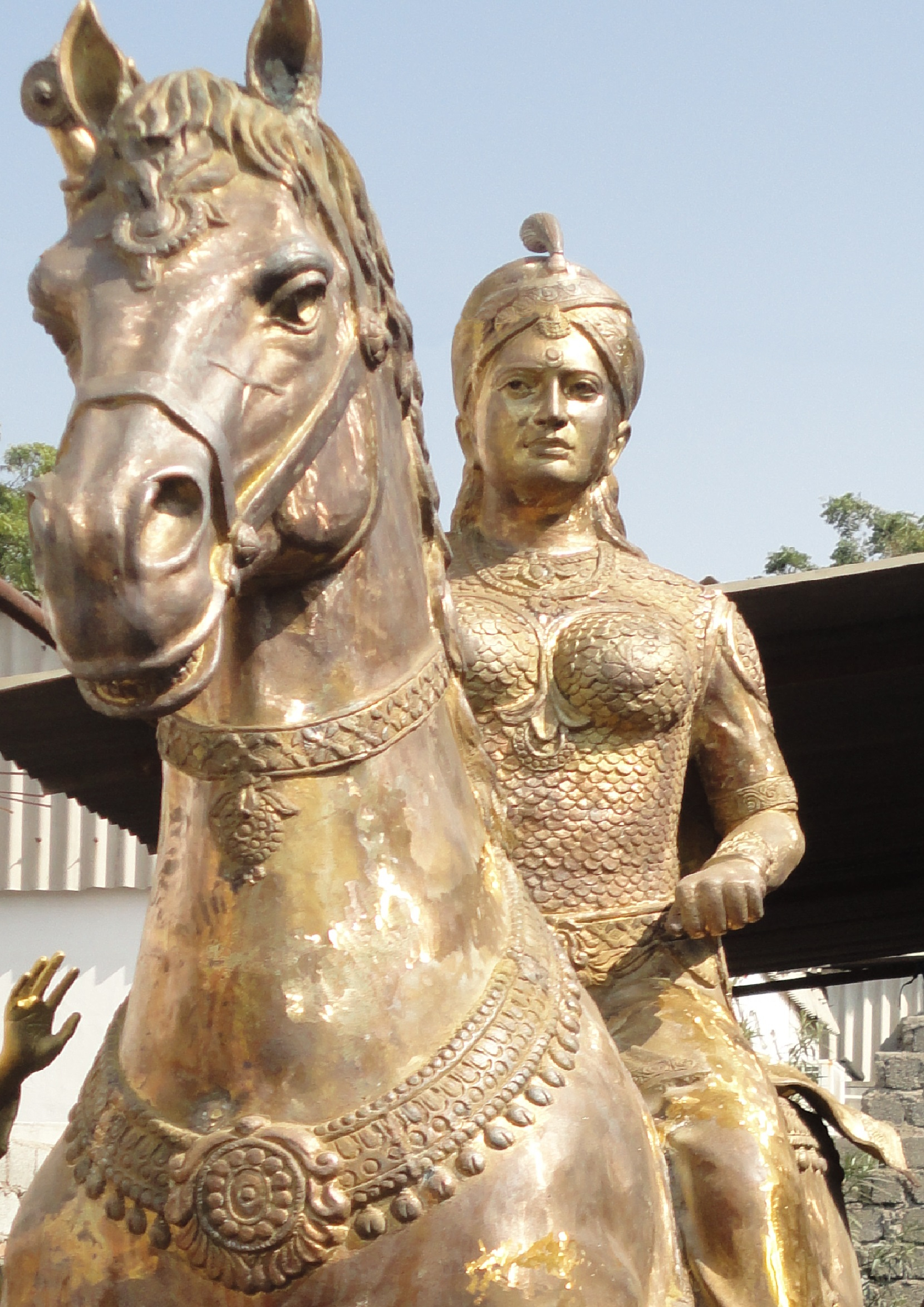
Statue of Rudrama Devi, the warrior-queen of the Kakatiya Empire

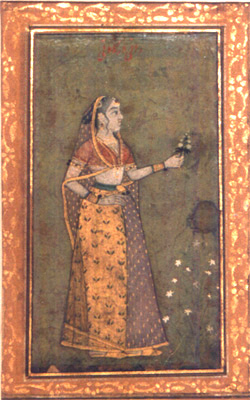
Rani Durgavati was the queen of Gondwana from 1550 until 1564 CE. She resisted the forces of Mughal emperor Akbar.

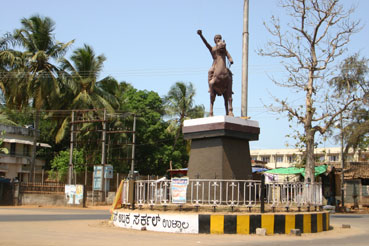
Statue of warrior-queen Abbakka Chowta in Ullal

Rudrama Devi was a monarch of the Kakatiya dynasty in the Deccan Plateau with capital at Warangal of present-day Telangana from 1263 until her death. She was one of the few women to rule as monarch in the Indian subcontinent and promoted a male image in order to do so. Akka Mahadevi was a prominent figure of the Veerashaiva Bhakti movement of the 12th century Karnataka. Her Vachanas in Kannada, a form of didactic poetry, are considered her most notable contribution to Kannada Bhakti literature. While, a few centuries later, Meera in northern India, became a leading Hindu mystic poet of the Bhakti movement.

The position of Indian women in society deteriorated during this period. Jauhar which became a custom among Rajputs was performed when they were faced with invaders like Turco-Afghans from the 11th century to avoid being enslaved and lose their honor. During the conquest of Sindh by Muhammad bin Qasim, Rani Bai and other Rajput women had performed the jauhar. It was committed thrice, in Chittor Fort alone, by many of the wives and children of the Rajput soldiers who died in battles at Chittorgarh Fort. The first time was led by Rani Padmini, wife of Ratnasimha, who was killed in the battle in 1303, and later, by Rani Karnavati in 1537.

The zenana was a Persian tradition brought in by the invading Muslims. Although originally only a feature of the courts of Muslim dynasties, it was also adopted by Hindu royal families. While separate spaces for women sometimes did exist in the ancient period, they didn't become a norm until the Muslim period. Under Akbar, there was a marked focus on secluding women and the creation of harems. This policy of Mughals was also emulated later by others like Chakma Raj and the Sikh kingdoms in Punjab.

The rights of a Muslim woman were impacted by the custom of hijab or purdah in Persian. Despite this, women took part in arts, writing, rites and rode horses while their habits sometimes swayed from the opinion of the ulama. The hijab and burqah was a practice in West Asia and became a part of regal practice under the Delhi Sultanate and Mughal Empire. The practice of purdah was later emulated by Hindus in North India. The queens often played a part in imperial politics behind the scene. In South India, some communities who adopted Islam have continued their ancestral matrilinear traditions like the Mappila. Ibn Battuta in the Muslim principality of Hannaur, witnessed 13 schools teaching Muslim women. Both genders were taught by mullahs, however, lower-classes were more uneducated.

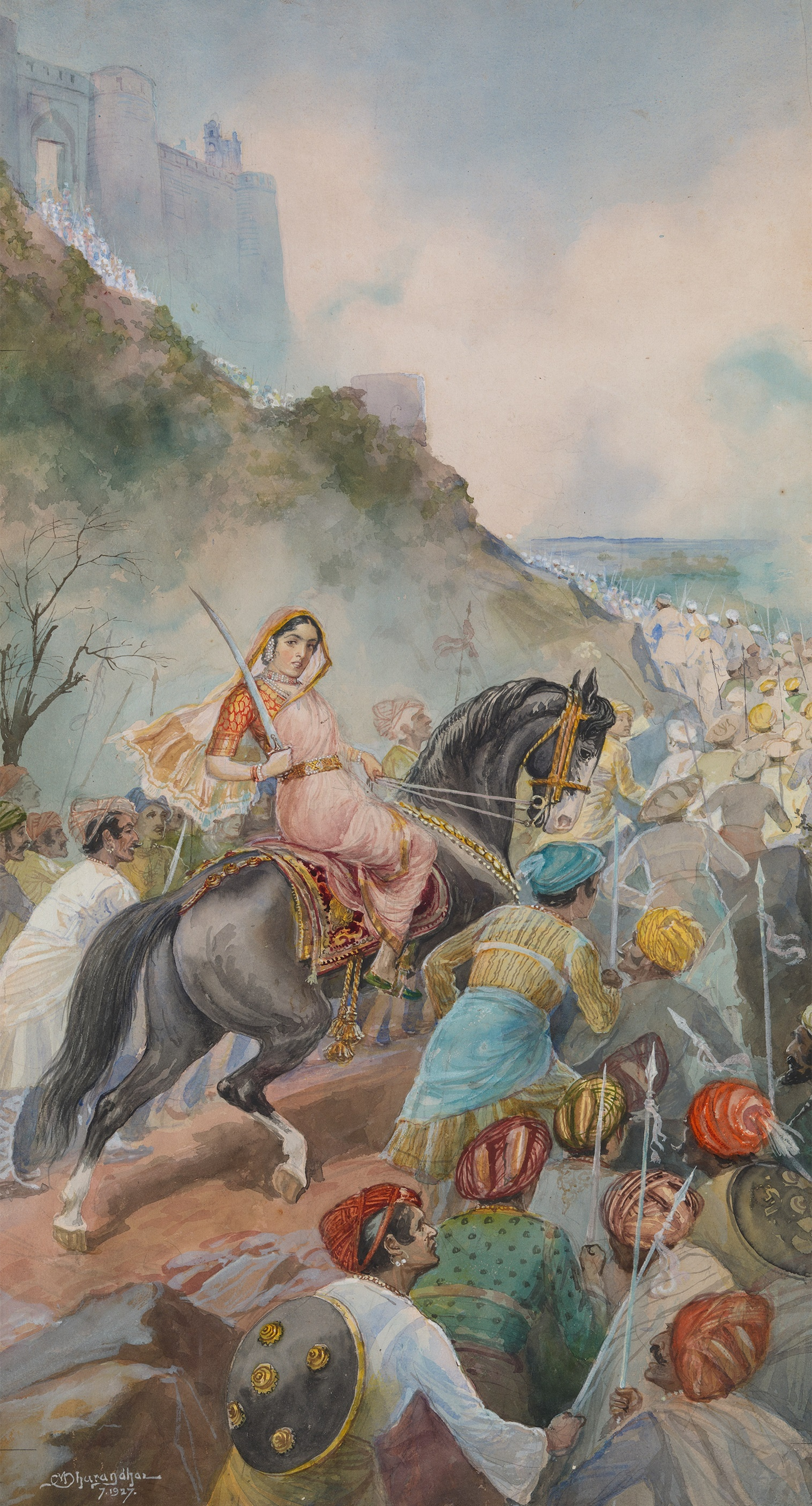
Tarabai, the regent of the Maratha Empire

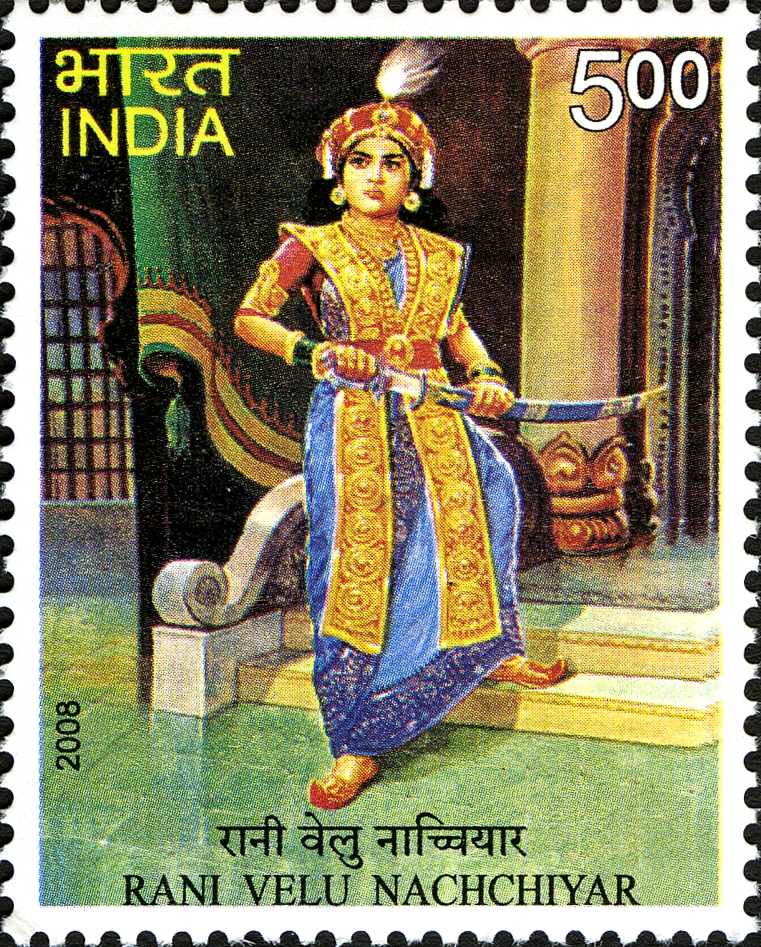
Velu Nachiyar was one of the earliest Indian queens to fight against the British colonial power in India.

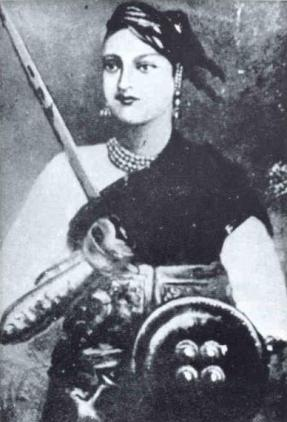
Lakshmibai, the Rani of Maratha-ruled Jhansi, one of the principal leaders of the Indian rebellion of 1857

The observance of purdah was not strict among the Turks. Among the reasons considered for its use are that it represented an elite status during the Muslim period and was also used to guard women and men from looking at each other with lust, and as during this period the rulers and nobility sometimes engaged in debauchery and excesses. Muslim nobility often engaged in lustful debauchery, concubines were not regarded as a shameful act, but a status of wealth. However, purdah was imposed by sultan Firuz Tughlaq. Akbar made it a rule that those women roaming without a veil be made a prostitute. He also directed that they should live within their house and travel under the supervision of a male. The upper-class women were better-off due to private education and entertainment. The purdah system became weaker as the Mughal empire declined. However, there were cases of women often becoming prominent in the fields of politics, literature, education, and religion also during this period. Razia Sultana (1205–1240) became the only woman monarch to have ever ruled Delhi.

The Gond Rani Durgavati (1524–1564) ruled for fifteen years before losing her life in a battle with Mughal emperor Akbar's general Asaf Khan in 1564. Chand Bibi defended Ahmednagar against the powerful Mughal forces of Akbar in the 1590s. Jehangir's wife Nur Jehan effectively wielded imperial power, and was recognised as the real power behind the Mughal throne. The Mughal princesses Jahanara and Zebunnissa were well-known poets, and also influenced the ruling powers. Abbakka Chowta was the first Tuluva Queen of Ullal who fought the Portuguese in the latter half of the 16th century. Shivaji's mother, Jijabai, was queen regent because of her ability as a warrior and an administrator. Tarabai was another female Maratha ruler. Keladi Chennamma fought against Bijapur Sultanate and defying Mughal emperor Aurangzeb. Onake Obavva was a woman who fought the forces of Hyder Ali single-handedly with a pestle (Onake) in the kingdom of Chitradurga. Mai Sukhan, with her small Sikh forces, strongly defended the town of Amritsar against external forces. While, Velu Nachiyar, was one of the earliest Indian queens to fight against the British colonial power in India. Kittur Chennamma was the Rani of Kittur, who led an armed force against the British East India Company in 1824 in defiance of the doctrine of lapse in an attempt to maintain Indian control over the region, but was defeated in the third war and died imprisoned. In South India, many women administered villages, towns, and divisions, and ushered in new social and religious institutions. Lakshmibai, the Rani of Maratha-ruled Jhansi, one of the principal leaders of the rebellion who earlier had lost her kingdom as a result of the Doctrine of Lapse.

== British rule ==
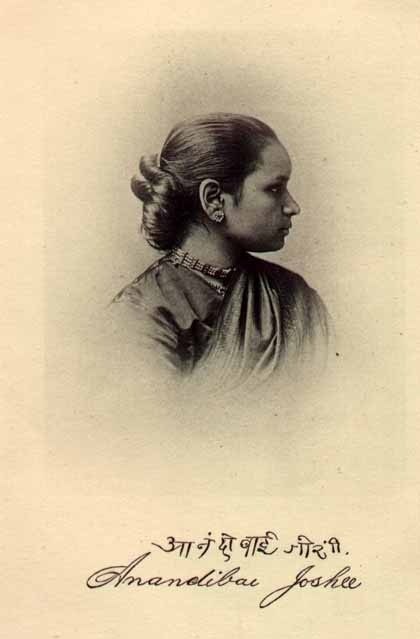
Anandibai Joshi was the first Indian female physician.

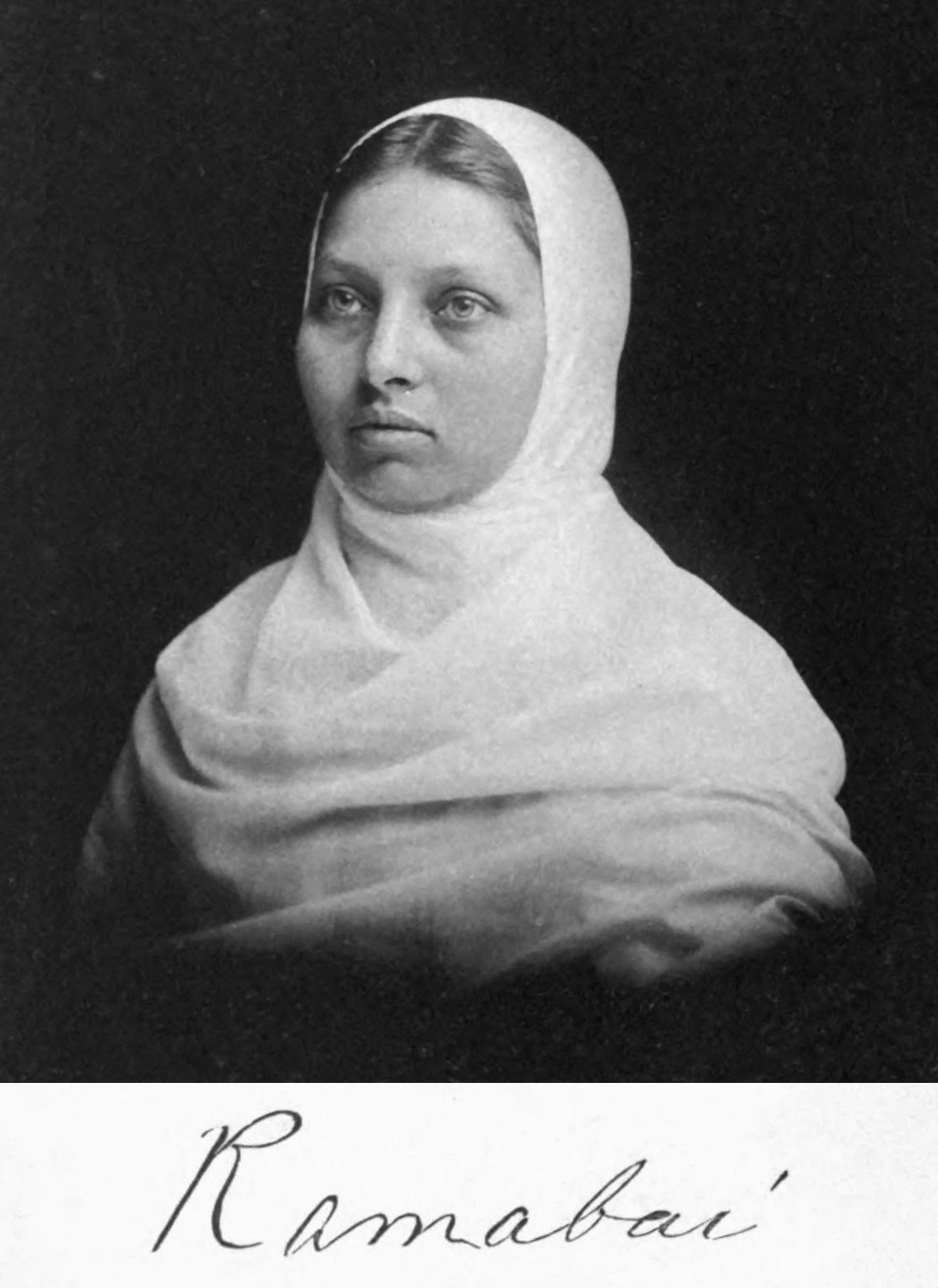
Pandita Ramabai was a social reformer, and a pioneer in the education and emancipation of women in India.

During the British Raj, many reformers such as Ram Mohan Roy, Dayanand Saraswati, Ishwar Chandra Vidyasagar and Jyotirao Phule fought for the betterment of women. Peary Charan Sarkar, a former student of Hindu College, Calcutta and a member of "Young Bengal", set up the first free school for girls in India in 1847 in Barasat, a suburb of Calcutta (later the school was named Kalikrishna Girls' High School).

While this might suggest that there was no positive British contribution during the Raj era, that is not entirely the case. Missionaries' wives such as Martha Mault née Mead and her daughter Eliza Caldwell née Mault are rightly remembered for pioneering the education and training of girls in south India. This practice was initially met with local resistance, as it flew in the face of tradition. Raja Rammohan Roy's efforts led to the abolition of Sati under Governor-General William Cavendish-Bentinck in 1829. Ishwar Chandra Vidyasagar's crusade for improvement in the situation of widows led to the Widow Remarriage Act of 1856. Many women reformers such as Pandita Ramabai also helped the cause of women.

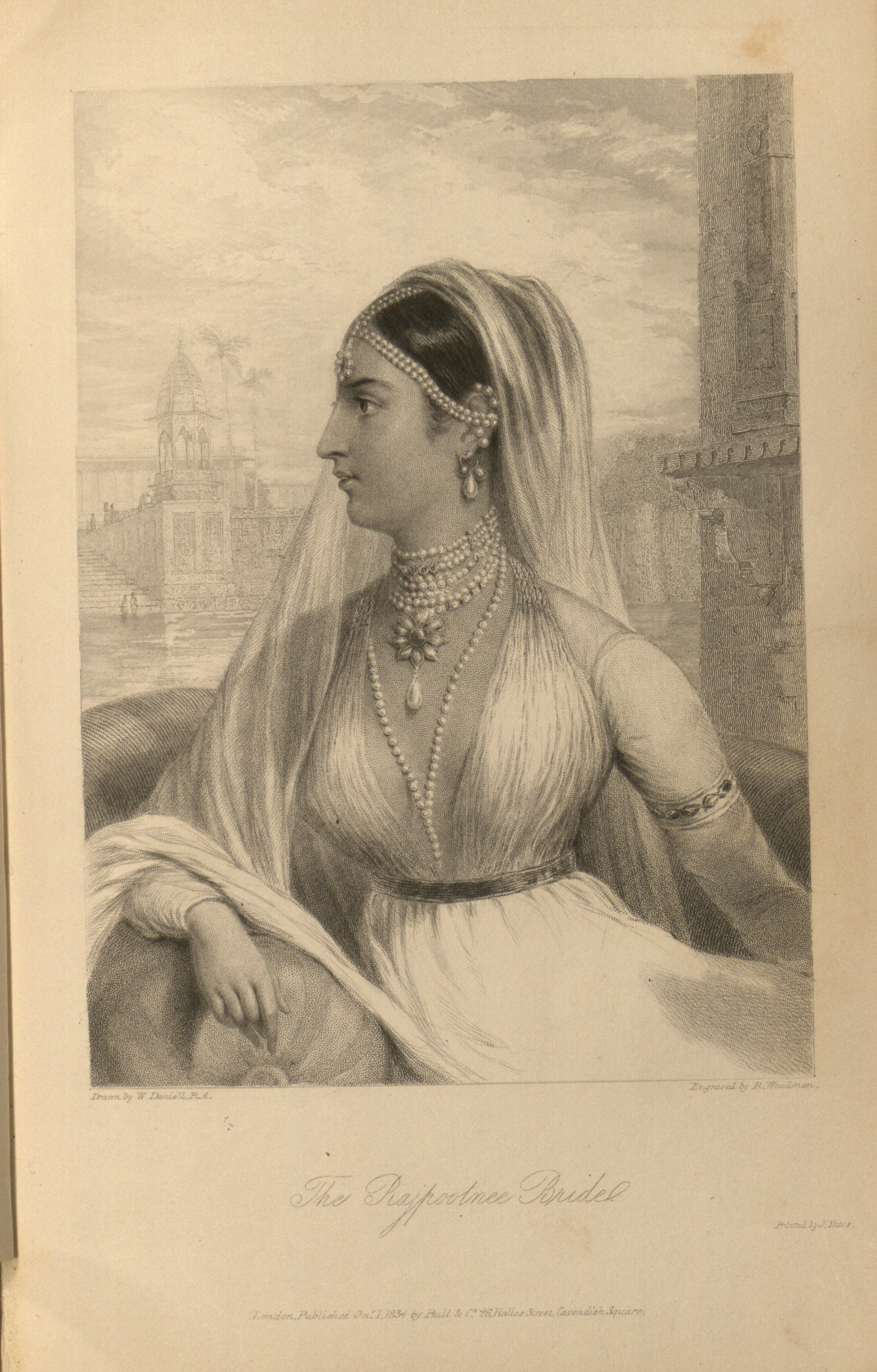
An image of a Rajput bride

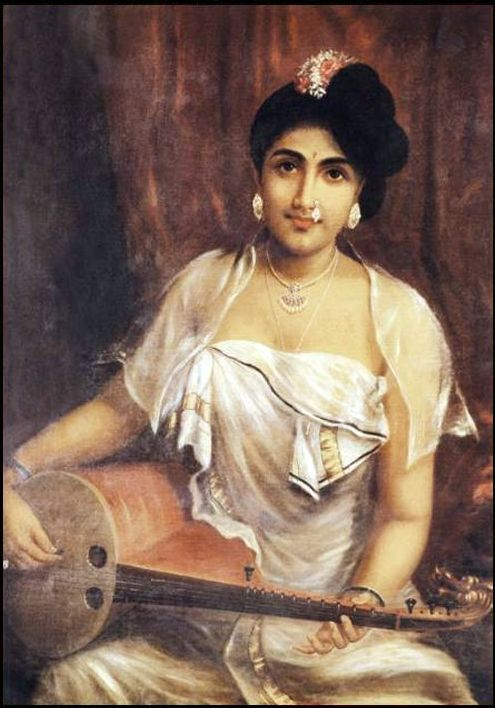
A Nair lady playing swarabat

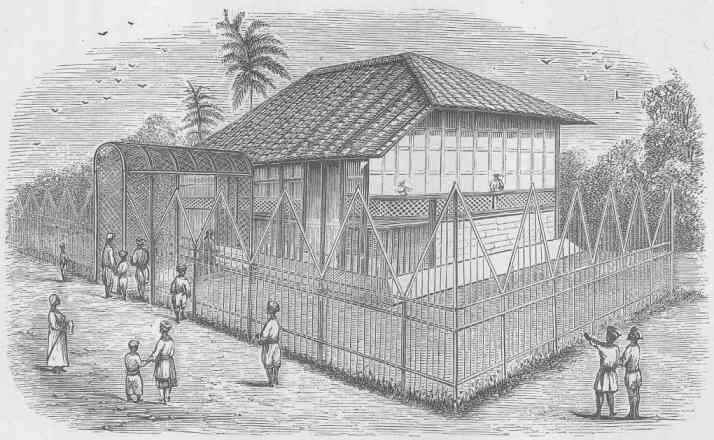
London Mission Bengali Girls' School, Calcutta (LMS, 1869, p. 12)

Kittur Chennamma, queen of the princely state Kittur in Karnataka, led an armed rebellion against the British in response to the Doctrine of lapse. Rani Lakshmi Bai, the Queen of Jhansi, led the Indian Rebellion of 1857 against the British. She is now widely considered as a national hero. Begum Hazrat Mahal, the co-ruler of Awadh, was another ruler who led the revolt of 1857. She refused deals with the British and later retreated to Nepal. The Begums of Bhopal were also considered notable female rulers during this period. They were trained in martial arts. Chandramukhi Basu, Kadambini Ganguly and Anandi Gopal Joshi were some of the earliest Indian women to obtain a degree.

In 1917, the first women's delegation met the Secretary of State to demand women's political rights, supported by the Indian National Congress. The All India Women's Education Conference was held in Pune in 1927, it became a major organisation in the movement for social change. In 1929, the Child Marriage Restraint Act was passed, stipulating fourteen as the minimum age of marriage for a girl. Mahatma Gandhi, himself a victim of child marriage at the age of thirteen, he later urged people to boycott child marriages and called upon young men to marry child widows.

== Post-Independence (1947 CE – present) ==
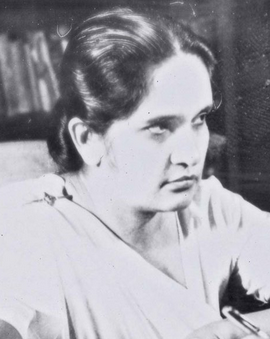
Sirimavo Bandaranaike, former Prime Minister of Sri Lanka and first female head of government in the world

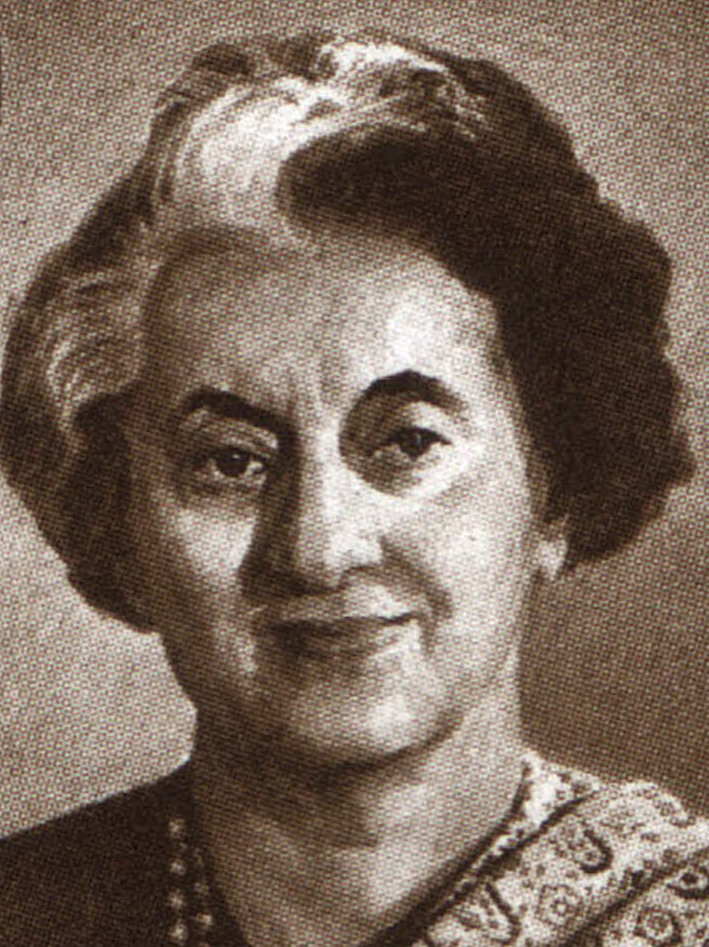
Indira Gandhi, former Prime Minister of India

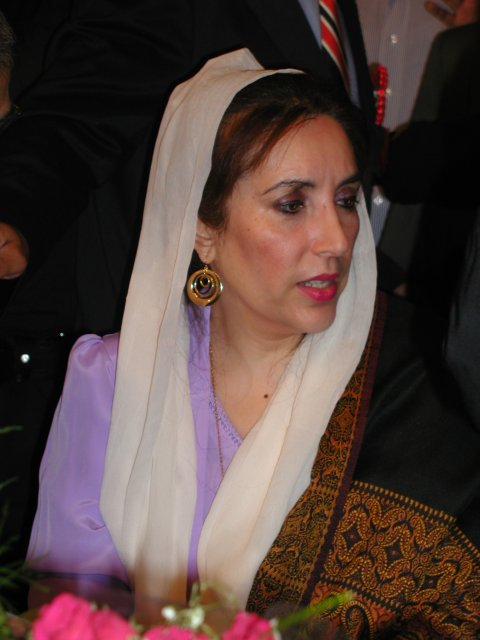
Benazir Bhutto, former Prime Minister of Pakistan

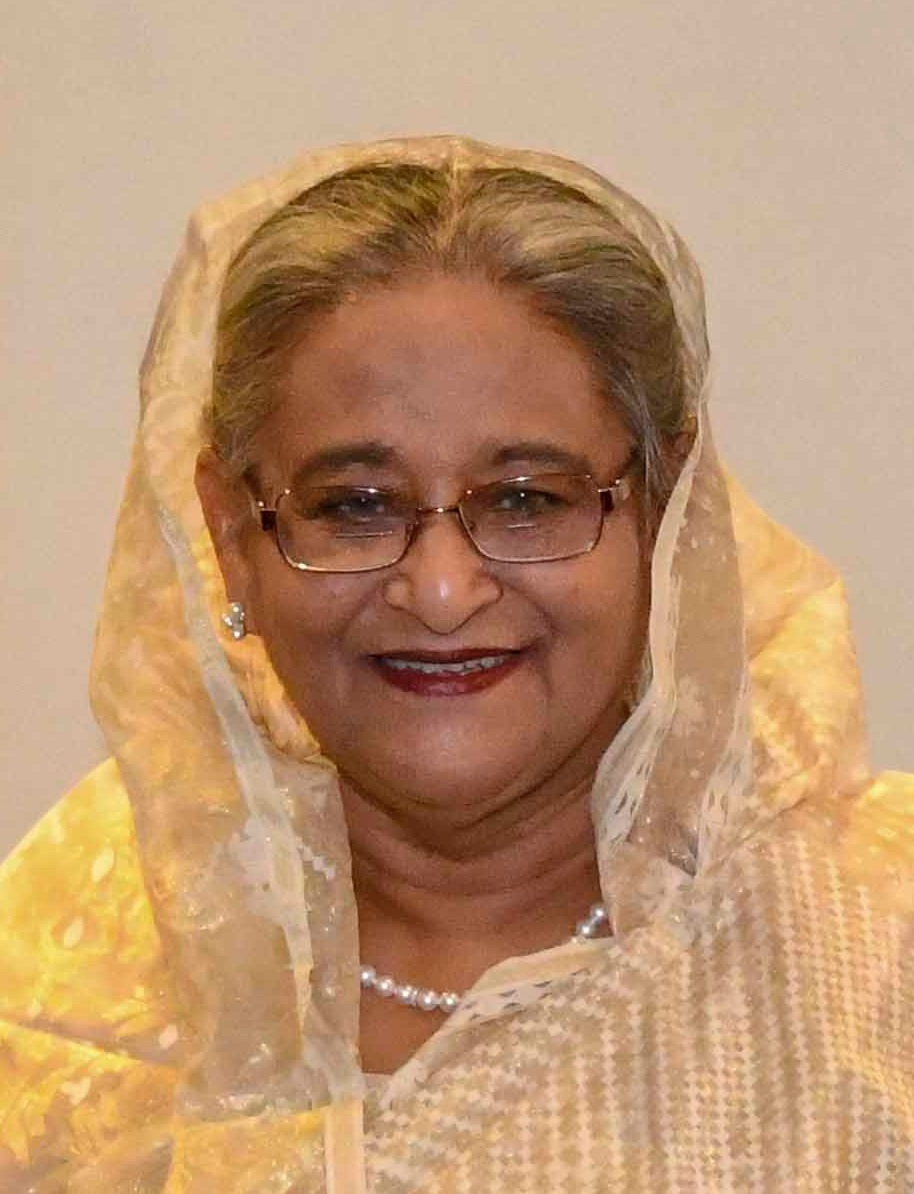
Sheikh Hasina, former Prime Minister of Bangladesh

Women have served as the head of state or government in India, Pakistan, Sri Lanka and Bangladesh.

Women have served as heads of state and government in India, Sri Lanka, Pakistan and Bangladesh. This includes:

- Sirimavo Bandaranaike, former Prime Minister of Sri Lanka
- Indira Gandhi, former Prime Minister of India
- Benazir Bhutto, former Prime Minister of Pakistan
- Khaleda Zia, former Prime Minister of Bangladesh
- Chandrika Kumaratunga, former President of Sri Lanka
- Pratibha Patil, former President of India
- Sheikh Hasina, former Prime Minister of Bangladesh
- Droupadi Murmu, current President of India
