= Chicholi railway station =

Railway Station in Maharashtra, India

Chicholi

General information
- Location: Chicholi, Bhandara district, Maharashtra; India
- Coordinates: 21.4663°N 79.7063°E
- Elevation: 287 metres (942 ft)
- System: Indian Railways station
- Owner: Indian Railways
- Operator: South East Central Railway zone
- Lines: Tumsar Road–Tirodi Branch Line; Bilaspur–Nagpur section Howrah–Nagpur–Mumbai line
- Platforms: 1
- Tracks: Broad gauge 1,676 mm (5 ft 6 in)

Construction
- Structure type: At ground
- Parking: Available
- Cycle facilities: Available

Other information
- Status: Functioning
- Station code: CCO
- Zone(s): South East Central Railway zone
- Division(s): Nagpur

Services
| Preceding station | Indian Railways | Following station |
|---|---|---|
| Mitewani towards ? | South East Central Railway zone Tumsar Road–Tirodi branch line on Bilaspur–Nagpur section of Howrah–Nagpur–Mumbai line | Gobarwahi towards ? |
Location
- Location within India Location within Maharashtra

Chicholi railway station serves Chicholi and nearby area in Bhandara district in Maharashtra, India. About 10 trains pass through the station daily.
