= Kachewani railway station =

Railway Station in Maharashtra, India

Kachewani

General information
- Location: Kachewani, Gondia district, Maharashtra; India
- Coordinates: 21.4297553°N 79.9813495°E
- Elevation: 304 metres (997 ft)
- System: Indian Railways station
- Owner: Indian Railways
- Operator: South East Central Railway zone
- Lines: Bilaspur–Nagpur section Howrah–Nagpur–Mumbai line
- Platforms: 3
- Tracks: 5 ft 6 in (1,676 mm) broad gauge

Construction
- Structure type: At ground
- Parking: Available
- Cycle facilities: Available

Other information
- Status: Functioning
- Station code: KWN
- Zone(s): South East Central Railway zone
- Division(s): Nagpur SEC

History
- Electrified: 1990–91

Services
Preceding station	Indian Railways	Following station
Gangajhari towards ?	South East Central Railway zone Bilaspur–Nagpur section of Howrah–Nagpur–Mumbai line	Tirora towards ?
Location
- Location within India Location within Maharashtra

Kachewani railway station serves Kachewani and surrounding villages in Bhandara district and Gondia district in Maharashtra, India.
