= Mitewani railway station =

Railway Station in Maharashtra, India

General information
- Location: Mitewani, Bhandara district, Maharashtra; India
- Coordinates: 21.4220°N 79.7139°E
- Elevation: 279 metres (915 ft)
- System: Indian Railways station
- Owner: Indian Railways
- Operator: South East Central Railway zone
- Lines: Tumsar Road–Tirodi branch line Bilaspur–Nagpur section Howrah–Nagpur–Mumbai line
- Platforms: 1
- Tracks: Broad gauge 1,676 mm (5 ft 6 in)

Construction
- Structure type: At ground
- Parking: Available
- Cycle facilities: Available

Other information
- Status: Functioning
- Station code: MTWN
- Zone(s): South East Central Railway zone
- Division(s): Nagpur
Location

Mitewani railway station serves Mitewani and surrounding villages in Bhandara district in Maharashtra, India.

Preceding station	Indian Railways	Following station
Tumsar Town towards ?	South East Central Railway zone Tumsar Road–Tirodi branch line on Bilaspur–Nagpur section of Howrah–Nagpur–Mumbai line	Chicholi towards ?
