= Tirodi railway station =

Rail station in India

Tirodi

General information
- Location: Tirodi, Balaghat district, Madhya Pradesh; India
- Coordinates: 21.6802°N 79.7166°E
- Elevation: 324 metres (1,063 ft)
- System: Indian Railways station
- Owner: Indian Railways
- Operator: South East Central Railway zone
- Line: Balaghat–Tumsar Road line
- Platforms: 2
- Tracks: Broad gauge 1,676 mm (5 ft 6 in)

Construction
- Structure type: At Ground
- Parking: Available
- Cycle facilities: Available

Other information
- Status: Functioning
- Station code: TRDI
- Zone(s): South East Central Railway zone
- Division(s): Nagpur

Services
Preceding station	Indian Railways	Following station
Sukli towards ?	South East Central Railway zone Balaghat–Tumsar Road line on Bilaspur–Nagpur section of Howrah–Nagpur–Mumbai line	Pauniyan towards ?
Location

Tirodi railway station serves Tirodi and surrounding villages in Balaghat of Madhya Pradesh, India.
