= Mahkepar Road railway station =

Railway station in Madhya Pradesh, India

Mahkepar Road

General information
- Location: Mahkepar Road, Balaghat district, Madhya Pradesh; India
- Coordinates: 21.6132°N 79.6764°E
- Elevation: 329 metres (1,079 ft)
- System: Indian Railways station
- Owner: Indian Railways
- Operator: South East Central Railway zone
- Lines: Tumsar Road–Tirodi branch line Bilaspur–Nagpur section Howrah–Nagpur–Mumbai line
- Platforms: 1
- Tracks: Broad gauge 1,676 mm (5 ft 6 in)

Construction
- Structure type: At ground
- Parking: Available
- Cycle facilities: Available

Other information
- Status: Functioning
- Station code: MKZ
- Zone(s): South East Central Railway zone
- Division(s): Nagpur

Services
Preceding station	Indian Railways	Following station
Dongri Buzurg towards ?	South East Central Railway zone Tumsar Road–Tirodi branch line on Bilaspur–Nagpur section of Howrah–Nagpur–Mumbai line	Sukli towards ?
Location

Mahkepar Road railway station (Hindi: महकेपार रोड रेल स्थानक) serves Mahkepar and surrounding villages in the Balaghat district of Madhya Pradesh, India.
