= Sukli railway station =

Railway station in Madhya Pradesh, India

Sukli

General information
- Location: Sukli, Balaghat district, Madhya Pradesh; India
- Coordinates: 21.6665°N 79.6779°E
- Elevation: 338 metres (1,109 ft)
- System: Indian railway station
- Owner: Indian Railways
- Operator: South East Central Railway zone
- Lines: Tumsar Road–Tirodi branch line Bilaspur–Nagpur section Howrah–Nagpur–Mumbai line
- Platforms: 1
- Tracks: Broad gauge 1,676 mm (5 ft 6 in)

Construction
- Structure type: At ground
- Parking: Available
- Cycle facilities: Available

Other information
- Status: Functioning
- Station code: SKLI
- Zone(s): South East Central Railway zone
- Division(s): Nagpur

Services
Preceding station	Indian Railways	Following station
Mahkepar Road towards ?	South East Central Railway zone Tumsar Road–Tirodi Branch Line on Bilaspur–Nagpur section of Howrah–Nagpur–Mumbai line	Tirodi towards ?
Location

Sukli railway station serves Sukli and surrounding villages in Bhandara district of Madhya Pradesh, India.
