= Gangajhari railway station =

Railway Station in Maharashtra, India

Gangajhari Hindi: गंगाझरी Marathi: गंगाझरी

General information
- Location: Gangajhari, Gondia district, Maharashtra; India
- Coordinates: 21.4427604°N 80.0586984°E
- Elevation: 316 metres (1,037 ft)
- System: Indian Railways station
- Owner: Indian Railways
- Operator: South East Central Railway zone
- Lines: Bilaspur–Nagpur section Howrah–Nagpur–Mumbai line
- Platforms: 3
- Tracks: 5 ft 6 in (1,676 mm) broad gauge

Construction
- Structure type: At Ground
- Parking: Available
- Cycle facilities: Available

Other information
- Status: Functioning
- Station code: GJ
- Zone(s): South East Central Railway zone
- Division(s): Nagpur SEC

History
- Electrified: 1990–91

Services
Preceding station	Indian Railways	Following station
Gondia Junction towards ?	South East Central Railway zone Bilaspur–Nagpur section of Howrah–Nagpur–Mumbai line	Kachewani towards ?
Location

Gangajhari railway station (Marathi: गंगाझरी रेल्वे स्थानक) serves Gangajhari and surrounding villages in Gondia district in Maharashtra, India.
