= Tirodi copper plates =

The Tiroḍī copper plates are an epigraphic record of the Vākāṭaka dynasty, documenting a land donation to a brāhmaṇa in the reign of king Pravarasena II in the fifth century CE. They were acquired by T. A. Wellsted at Tirodi in District Balaghat, Madhya Pradesh, India.

== Location ==
Tiroḍī is located eight miles south-east of Katangi in the Balaghat district of Madhya Pradesh. According to historian Ajay Mitra Shastri, the donated village of Kosambakhaṇḍa mentioned in the inscription is represented by the modern Kosamba (coordinates: 21° 38' 0" North, 79° 39' 0" East). The original plates are at the Central Museum, Nagpur. An inked impression on paper is in the British Museum.

== Publication ==
The Tiroḍī copper-plate charter was read and published by V. V. Mirashi in 1963.

== Description and Contents ==
The Tiroḍī copper-plate charter consists of a series of copper plates with a seal. The text of the inscription is Sanskrit throughout. The object of the inscription is to record the grant, by Pravarasena II, of the village Kosambakhaṇḍa to a person named Varuṇārya of the Harkari gotra. He belonged to the Atharvaveda and was master of the three Vedas. The grant is dated on the twelfth day of the dark half of the month of Māgha during the 23rd year of donor's reign. The charter was written by Navamidāsa who is styled rajyādhikṛta or state officer.

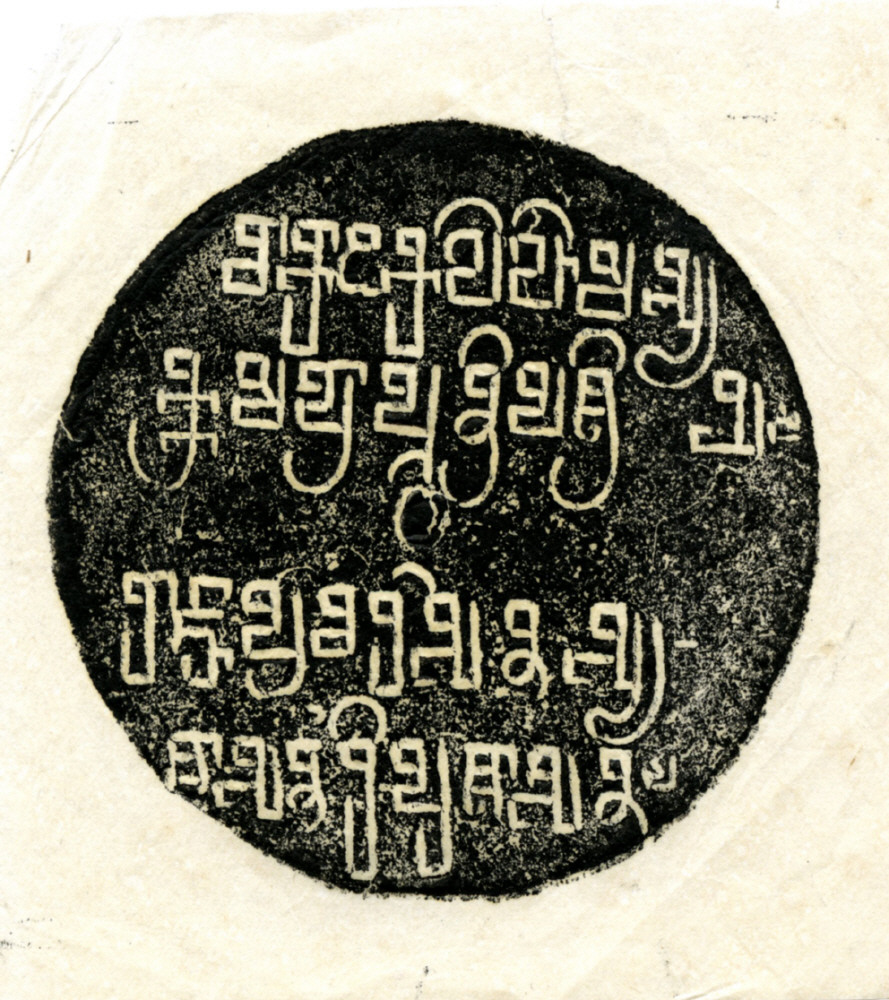
Seal of Pravarasena II

== Metrics ==
The seal carries a verse in anuṣṭubh metre.

== Translation ==
Seal. A charter of king Pravarasêna, the ornament of the Vâkâtakas, who has attained royal dignity by, inheritance, (is) a charter for (the observance of even his) enemies!

== See also ==
- Indian inscriptions
- South Indian Inscriptions
- Laguna Copperplate Inscription
