= Gobarwahi railway station =

Railway station in Maharashtra

General information
- Location: Gobarwahi, Bhandara district, Maharashtra; India
- Coordinates: 21.51469°N 79.72298°E
- Elevation: 323 metres (1,060 ft)
- System: Indian Railways station
- Owner: Indian Railways
- Operator: South East Central Railway zone
- Lines: Tumsar Road–Tirodi branch line Bilaspur–Nagpur section Howrah–Nagpur–Mumbai line
- Platforms: 1
- Tracks: Broad gauge 1,676 mm (5 ft 6 in)

Construction
- Structure type: At ground
- Parking: Available
- Cycle facilities: Available

Other information
- Status: Functioning
- Station code: GBRI
- Zone(s): South East Central Railway zone
- Division(s): Nagpur

Services
| Preceding station | Indian Railways | Following station |
|---|---|---|
| Chicholi towards ? | South East Central Railway zone Tumsar Road–Tirodi branch line on Bilaspur–Nagpur section of Howrah–Nagpur–Mumbai line | Dongri Buzurg towards ? |
Location
- Location within India Location within Maharashtra

Gobarwahi railway station serves Gobarwahi a large village located north of Tumsar and nearby villages in Bhandara district in Maharashtra, India.
