= Chamak copper plates =

- village
- Location in Maharashtra, India
- Coordinates: 21.12°N 77.28°E
- Country: India
- State: Maharashtra
- District: Amravati
- Elevation: 369 m (1,211 ft)

Population (2001)
  - Total: 1,134

Languages
  - Official: Marathi
- Time zone: UTC+5:30 (IST)
- PIN: 444806
- Telephone code: 07223
- Vehicle registration: MH 27

The Chamak copper plates are an epigraphic record of the Vākāṭaka dynasty, documenting a land donation to brāhmaṇas in the reign of king Pravarasena II in the fifth century CE. They were found at Chamak, in District Amravati, Maharashtra, India.

== Location ==
Chamak or Chammak is located 6.0 miles southwest of Acalpur according to Amravati district Gazetteer published by the Government of Maharashtra. According to J. F. Fleet the village is four miles s. w. of Ilichpur (Ellichpur). This is the old name for Achalpur. Chamak currently consists of a cluster of three villages on the banks of the Chandrabhāgā river with those on the eastern bank known as Chamak Khurd and Chamak Buzurg. The plates were found in a field near the village in the 19th century and were acquired by Major H. Szczepanski. They are now in the collection of the British Library registered under the number Ind. Ch. no. 16.

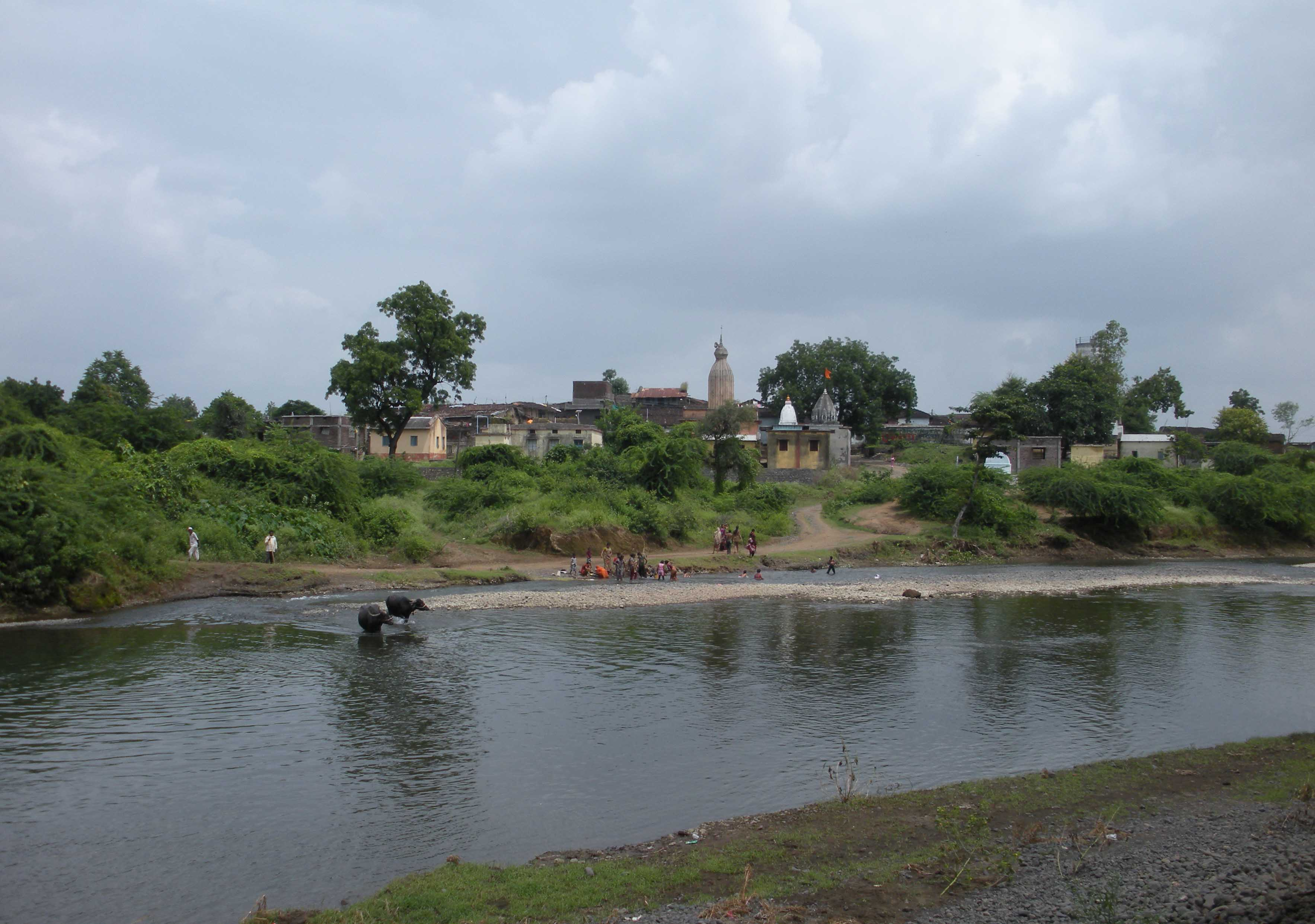
Chamak Khurd village in 2012

== Publication ==
The Chamak copper-plate charter was read and published by John Faithfull Fleet in 1888. The record was subsequently published by V. V. Mirashi in 1963.

== Description and Contents ==
The Chamak charter consists of a series of copper plates linked together with a ring held with a seal. The text of the inscription is Sanskrit throughout. The object of the inscription is to record the grant, by Pravarasena II, of the village Charmāka situated on the bank of the Madhunadī in the rājya of Bhojakaṭa. The grant consisted of 8000 bhūmi-s by the royal measure. The donees were a "thousand Brāhmaṇas", although only 49 are actually named. The grant was made at the request of Koṇḍarāja, the son of Śatrughnarāja. This Koṇḍarāja is also mentioned in line 45 of the Pattan copper plates. The grant is dated on the thirteenth tithi of the bright fortnight of Jyeṣṭha in the 18th regnal year. The senāpati was Citravarman. From the Belorā copper plates, Set B, we know that Citravarman was holding the same post seven years earlier in the 11th regnal year of Pravarasena II.

== Metrics ==
The seal carries a verse in anuṣṭubh metre.

== See also ==
- Indian inscriptions
