= Vasudev Vishnu Mirashi =

Indian writer and scholar (1893–1985)

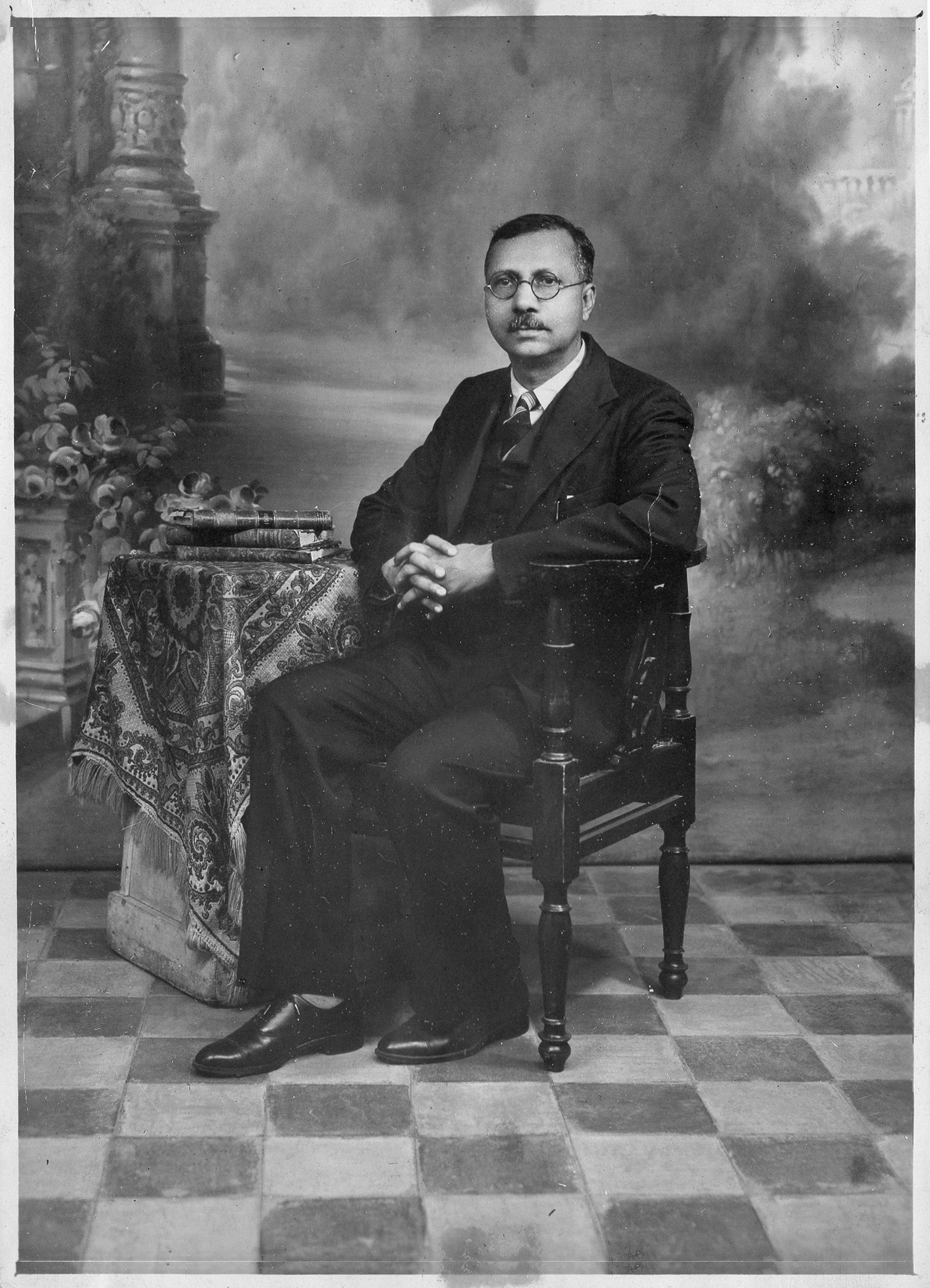
- Born: 1893
- Died: 1985 (aged 91–92)
- Writing career
- Subjects: Sanskrit, History
- Notable awards: Sahitya Akademi Fellowship (1973); Padma Bhushan (1975)

Vasudev Vishnu Mirashi (1893–1985) was a Sanskrit scholar and a prominent Indologist of the 20th century who hailed from Maharashtra, India. He was an expert of his times on stone and copper inscriptions and the coinage of ancient India. For his contributions to Indian history he was honoured with the title Mahamahopadhyaya by the British Indian Government in 1941. He was also awarded Padma Bhushan in 1975 by the President of India.

== Early life ==
Dr. Mirashi was born in a middle-class family on 13 March 1893 at Kuwale village in Ratnagiri district. After completing his primary and secondary school education at Kolhapur (primarily Rajaram High School) he moved to Pune. He stood first in order of merit in all school examinations and was awarded a State Scholarship, the Alfred Half-Freeship, The Ghatge Scholarship, and the Sir George Le Grand Jacob Scholarship. He obtained his bachelor's degree (BA) in 1914 and did his Master's (MA) in 1917 in the subject of Sanskrit at Deccan College. He received the Varjeevandas Madhavadas Sanskrit Scholarship for his BA studies, and while he wanted to study mathematics the rules of the scholarship required him to take Sanskrit; this proved to be a turning point in his career. He received the Dakshina Scholarship for his MA studies and stood first in the Language Group. As a result he won the Bhagwandas Purushottamdas Sanskrit Scholarship, the Jhala Vedanta Prize, and the Lawrence Jenkins Scholarship, the last one for studying for his Bachelor of Laws (LLB) degree, Subsequently he earned his doctorate (Ph.D.) from the University of Bombay. His dissertation on Relation between the Dharmasutras and the Metrical Smrutis and the Evolution of Hindu Law won the Vishwanath Mandalik Gold Medal and Prize of the University of Bombay.

== Career ==
After his academic career, he shifted to Mumbai and worked as Assistant Professor of Sanskrit at Elphinstone College while simultaneously studying for his law degree. Subsequently, in 1919, he was appointed to the Sanskrit chair at Morris College in Nagpur. He was appointed principal of the same college in 1942. During 1947-1950, he served as the principal of Vidarbha Mahavidyalaya in Amravati.

In the 1957-1966 period, Mirashi worked as the Honorary Professor of Ancient Indian History and Culture, Head of the Department of Sanskrit, Pali, and Prakrit, and Head of the Department of Post-Graduate Teaching in Humanities at Nagpur University . He was also the Dean of the Faculty of Arts at the university.

Professor Mirashi was also one of the earliest proponents of the Vidarbha Sanshodhan Mandal (historical research society based in Nagpur) and for many years served as its Chairman.

== Authorship ==
Mirashi wrote 30 research works in English, Marathi, and Hindi, and more than 275 papers in various Indological journals.

His Inscriptions of the Kalchuri-Chedi Era (1955), Inscriptions of the Vakatakas (1963), and Inscriptions of the Silaharas (1977) were published in the renowned Corpus Inscriptionum Indicarum Series of the Archaeological Survey of India. He also worked on the stone inscriptions of Satvahanas and Kshatrapas.

Mirashi's other important works comprise four volumes of Literary & Historical Studies in Indology, Kalidasa, and Bhavabhuti.

== Honours ==
Mirashi received a large number of honours for his research work.

In 1941, the then Viceroy of India, Linlithgow, honoured Mirashi with the Mahamahopadhyaya title. In 1966, the then President of India, S. Radhakrishnan, awarded him a Certificate of Honour for proficiency in Sanskrit learning. In 1970, he was nominated as the Honorary Correspondent of the Archaeological Department of the Government of India.

The universities of Saugar and Nagpur conferred him with honorary D. Litt. degrees in 1958 and 1960, respectively. He was elected General President of the Numismatic Society of India (1951), the All India Oriental Conference (1959), and the Indian History Congress (1961). The Numismatic Society of India elected him its Honorary Fellow in 1959, and the Epigraphical Society of India did the same in 1974.

The Sahitya Akademi of India elected Mirashi as a fellow in 1973 and he was awarded the Padma Bhushan in 1975.

Mirashi died on 3 April 1985.

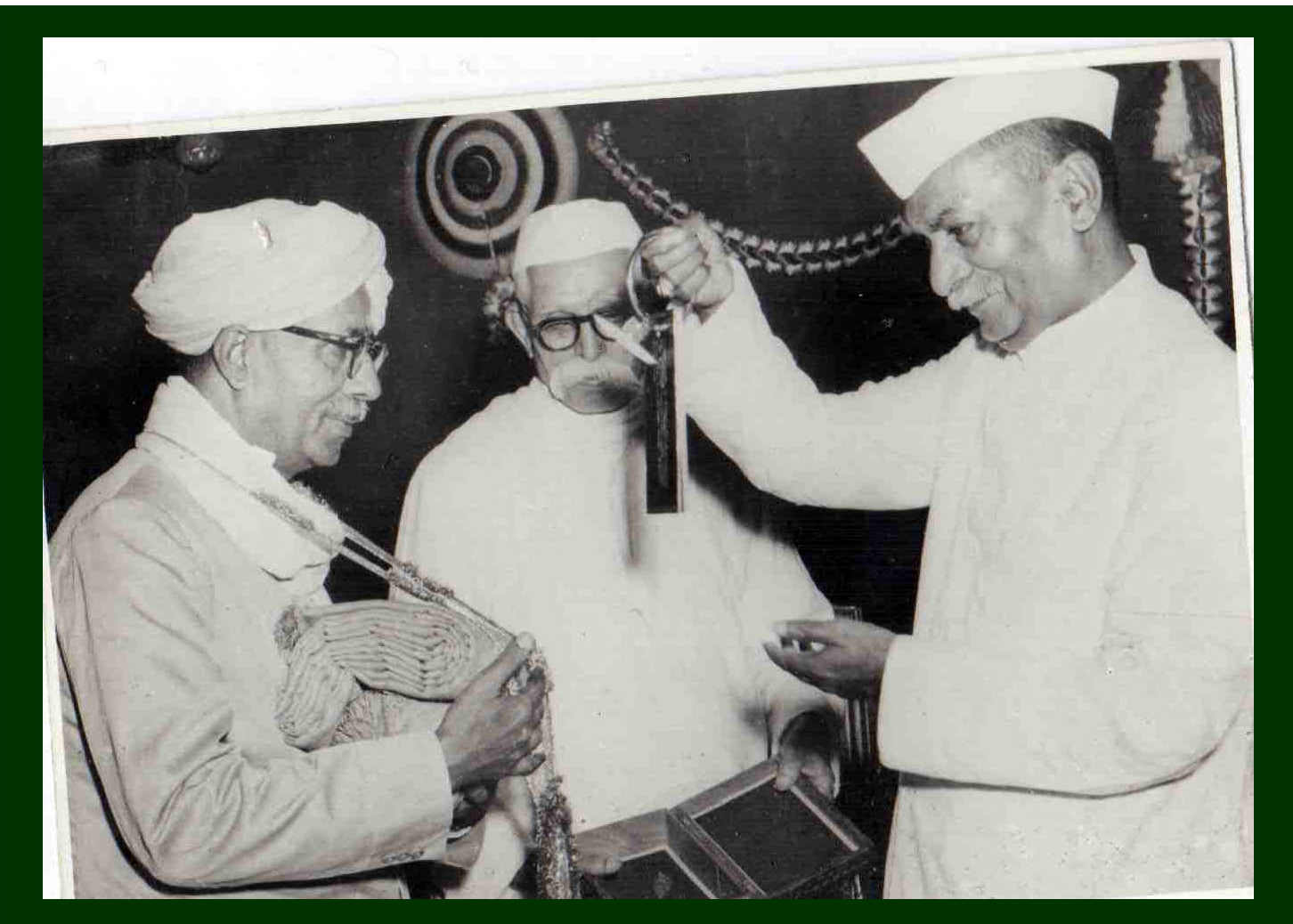
Dr Rajendra Prasad awarding Tamrapatra to Prof Mirashi, 1956

== See also ==
- Vakataka dynasty
- Ajanta Caves
- Tirodi copper plates
- Indology
- Sahitya Akademi Fellowship
- Padma Bhushan Awards (1970-1979)
- Sanskrit epigraphy
