= Tirodi =

- Town
- Location in Madhya Pradesh, India Tirodi (India)
- Coordinates: 21.683°N 79.731°E
- Country: India
- State: Madhya Pradesh
- District: Balaghat
- Elevation: 375 m (1,230 ft)

Population (2001)
  - Total: 8,847

Languages
  - Official: Hindi
- Time zone: UTC+5:30 (IST)
- ISO 3166 code: IN-MP
- Vehicle registration: MP

Tirodi is a census town in Balaghat district in the Indian state of Madhya Pradesh.

== Geography ==
Tirodi has an average elevation of 375 metres (1,230 feet).

== Demographics ==
As of 2001 India census, Tirodi had a population of 8,847. Males constitute 49% of the population and females 51%. Tirodi has an average literacy rate of 65%, higher than the national average of 59.5%: male literacy is 75%, and female literacy is 56%. In Tirodi, 15% of the population is under 6 years of age.

== Transport ==
The nearest airport is Jabalpur.

== History ==
Tirodi copper plates of Pravarasena II mention about his land grants.

== See also ==
- Tirodi railway station
