= Rudrasena II =

- Mahārāja

Vakataka king of Nandivardhana-Pravarapura
- Reign: c. 385 – 390 CE
- Predecessor: Prithivishena I
- Successor: Prabhavatigupta (regent)
- Spouse: Prabhavatigupta
- Issue: Divakarasena, Damodarasena, Pravarasena II
- House: Vakataka

Rudrasena II (r. c. 385 – 390 CE) was a ruler of the Pravarapura-Nandivardhana branch of the Vakataka dynasty. While his reign was short, he notably married Prabhavatigupta, the daughter of the Gupta emperor Chandragupta II. His early death led to Prabhavatigupta ruling as regent for an extended period of time as his sons Divakarasena, Damodarasena, and Pravarasena II were all minors.

Rudrasena's brief reign was also notable for religious changes which were likely brought about by increased Gupta influence. Unlike his ancestors who were all devout Shaivites (worshippers of Shiva), Rudrasena became a devotee of Chakrapani or Vishnu. Rudrasena's change of faith was probably encouraged by his powerful father-in-law and his queen, who were both staunch Vaishnavites.
