= Dewhadi =

- Village
- Location in Maharashtra, India
- Coordinates: 21.3522°N 79.7497°E
- Country: India
- State: Maharashtra
- District: Bhandara

Population (2001)
  - Total: 5,759

Languages
  - Official: Marathi
- Time zone: UTC+5:30 (IST)
- PIN: 441913

Dewhadi is a census town located in Tumsar taluka of Bhandara district in the state of Maharashtra, India.

== Demographics ==
As of 2001 India census, Dewhadi had a population of 5759. Males constitute 50% of the population and females 50%. Dewhadi has an average literacy rate of 75%, higher than the national average of 59.5%: male literacy is 82% and female literacy is 67%. In Dewhadi, 11% of the population is under 6 years of age.
