= Mansar, India =

Mansar
- Census town
- Location in Maharashtra, India
- Coordinates: 21.4°N 79.25°E
- Country: India
- State: Maharashtra
- District: Nagpur
- Elevation: 471 m (1,545 ft)

Population (2011)
  - Total: 6,458

Languages
  - Official: Marathi
- Time zone: UTC+5:30 (IST)

Mansar is a census town in Ramtek tehsil of Nagpur district in the Indian state of Maharashtra. This town is located 5 km west of Ramtek and 45 km northeast of Nagpur city.

== Geography ==
Mansar is located at 21.4°N 79.25°E. It has an average elevation of 471 metres (1545 feet).

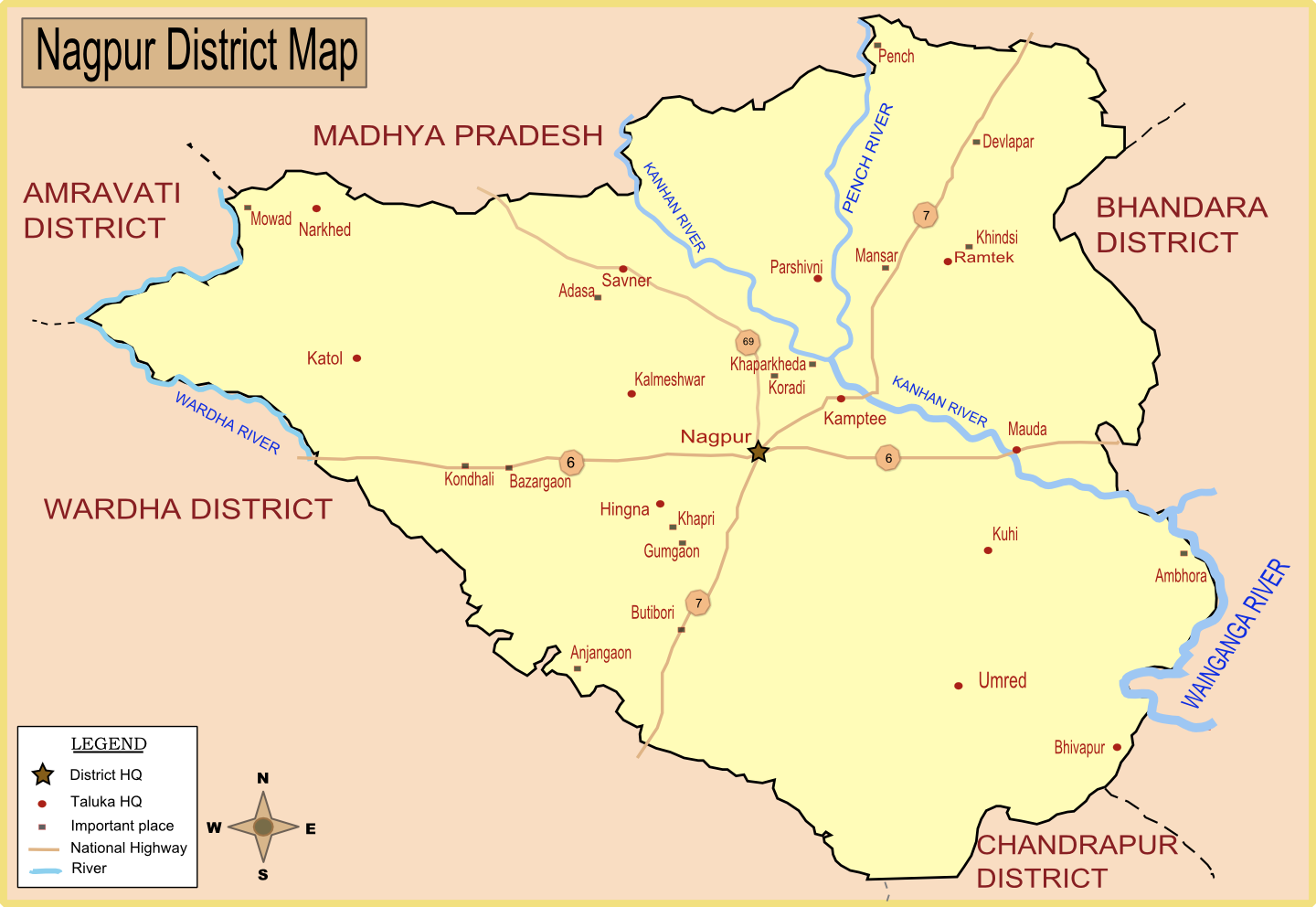
Map of Nagpur district with major towns (including Mansar) and rivers.

== History ==
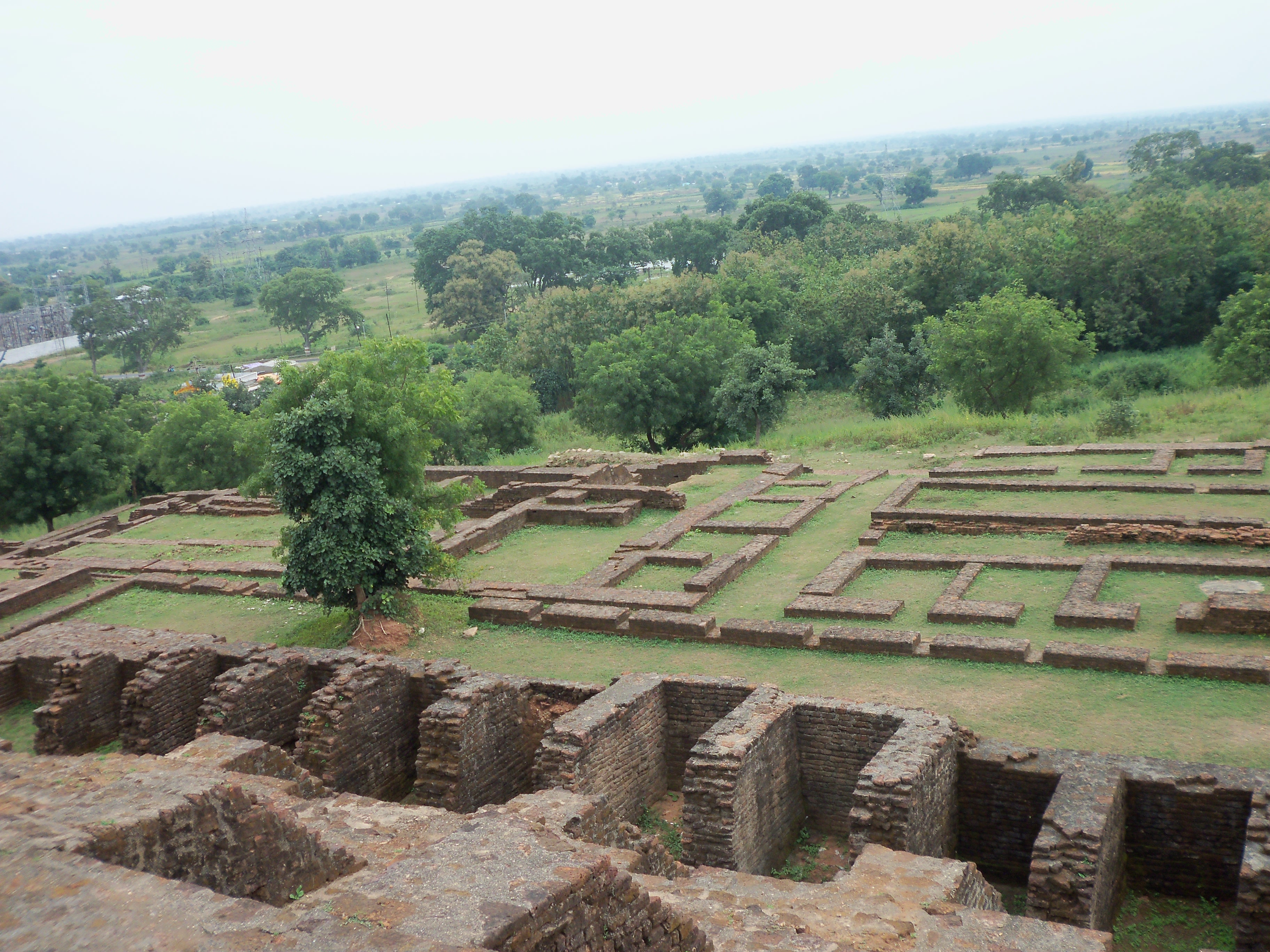
Remains of Pravarapura

In 1972, an image of a deity, later identified as Shiva Vamana was found from a hillock in Mansar, locally known as Hidimba Tekri. Important excavations were carried out at the ancient sites of Mansar since 1997-98, under the aegis of the Bodhisatva Nagarjun Smarak Samstha Va Anusandhan Kendra, Nagpur and under the directions of Jagat Pati Joshi and A. K. Sharma. So far 5 sites have been excavated in Mansar, which are designated as MNS 1, MNS 2, MNS 3, MNS 4 and MNS 5. Exposed Brick Structures containing the Buddhist Monastery, Buddhist Box Pattern Stupa, Small Temples and the Palace Structure. Various Stone images also exposed during the Excavation. Identified as the Capital of Vakatakas. The evidence of Purushamedha and the construction of Sheyna-Chiti is the important point. These excavations have resulted in the discovery of various shrines (MNS 3, 4, 5) and a palace complex (MNS 2), identified as Pravarapura, the capital of the Vakataka king Pravarasena II (1st half of 5th century). Adjacent to this palace, on Hidimba Tekri (MNS 3), an extensive temple complex has been unearthed, identified as Pravareśvara. A 3 m tall lime model of a male human figure in crouching position was found underneath one of the terraces of MNS 3. Significant 5th-century sculptures of Hindu deities, artefacts and some coins have been discovered in the excavations.

The water reservoir around the site and findings of ancient tools and other objects point to the fact that a large population inhabited the area 1600 years ago. The discovery has made Mansar one of the prime archaeological sites in the country

== Demographics ==
As of 2001 India census, Mansar had a population of 6458. Males constitute 50% of the population and females 50%. Mansar has an average literacy rate of 69%, higher than the national average of 59.5%: male literacy is 76%, and female literacy is 61%. In Mansar, 13% of the population is under 6 years of age.
