= Prabhavatigupta =

Queen and regent of the Indian Vakataka dynasty

- Maharani

Regent of the Vakataka Empire
- Regency: c. 390 – 410 CE
- Monarch: Divakarasena

Queen Consort of the Vakataka Empire
- Tenure: c. 385 CE - 390 CE
- Born: Pataliputra, Gupta Empire (present-day Bihar, India)
- Died: c. 443; Vatsagulma, Vakataka Empire (present-day Maharashtra, India)
- Spouse: Rudrasena II
- Issue: Divakarasena, Damodarasena and Pravarasena II
- House: Gupta (by birth); Vakataka (by marriage)
- Father: Chandragupta II
- Mother: Kuberanaga
- Religion: Hinduism

Prabhavatigupta (died c. 443) was a Gupta princess and Vakataka queen who was the consort of Maharaja Rudrasena II. Following the death of her husband, she effectively ruled the Vakataka Empire as regent from about 390 to 410.

== Early life ==
Prabhavatigupta was the daughter of Chandragupta II, the ruler of the Gupta Empire, and queen Kuberanaga. She married Rudrasena II of the Vakataka dynasty during the reign of Rudrasena's father, Prithivishena I. Rudrasena had a short reign of only about five years before he died. Prabhavatigupta had three sons with Rudrasena - Divakarasena, Damodarasena, and Pravarasena – but none of them were adults at the time of their father's premature death. They may have also had a daughter, the wife of Prabhavatigupta's brother Ghatotkachagupta.

== Regent of the Vakataka Empire ==
Divakarasena, the eldest son of Rudrasena and Prabhavatigupta, was the Yuvaraja or Crown Prince of the Vakataka kingdom. Since he was still a child, Prabhavatigupta assumed the reigns of government and ruled in his name. We know that Prabhavatigupta ruled for at least 13 years as a regent because her Pune grant is dated to the thirteenth year of her own rule, where she calls herself "Mother of the Yuvaraja Divakarasena". It seems that Prabhavatigupta retained control of the Vakataka government even after Crown Prince Divakarasena reached his sixteenth year and was no longer a minor, as there is no evidence that Divakarasena ever ascended his paternal throne as Maharaja. Prabhavatigupta's continued political dominance may be either due to some special circumstances which prevented Divakarasena from ruling in his own name, or simply due to Prabhavatigupta's own love of power.

Divakarasena was eventually succeeded by his younger brother Damodarasena around 410. It is possible that for a time, Prabhavatigupta acted as regent on his behalf as well. During Prabhavatigupta's time in power, Gupta influence over the Vakatakas reached its peak. Prabhavatigupta's inscriptions provide her own Gupta genealogy and emphasize her own natal connections. Her gotra is given as Dharana, which was the gotra of her father, rather than the Vishnuvriddha gotra of the Vakataka dynasty. Indeed, for the 20 or so years of Prabhavatigupta's regency, the Vakataka realm was "practically a part of the Gupta empire."

== Later life ==
Prabhavatigupta remained active in public life for a few decades after the end of her regency. We find her making a grant in the 19th year of the reign of her son Pravarasena II (c.420–455), where she is called "mother of the illustrious Maharajas Damodarasena and Pravarasena". She was still alive four years later, when Pravarasena II made a grant for the spiritual welfare of both himself and his mother in this life and the next. In the Patna Museum Plate, all religious merit from Pravarasena's donation is said to accrue to the Queen Mother. Prabhavatigupta seems to have concerned herself deeply with religious matters. She is described as a devotee of Bhagavat (Vishnu), and she issued a charter from the feet of her tutelary deity Ramagirisvamin, identified with the deity at Ramtek near Nagpur.
