= Tirora railway station =

Railway Station in Maharashtra, India

General information
- Location: Tirora, Gondia district, Maharashtra 441911; India
- Coordinates: 21.4140500°N 79.9181724°E
- Elevation: 282 metres (925 ft)
- System: Indian Railways station
- Owner: Indian Railways
- Operator: South East Central Railway zone
- Lines: Bilaspur–Nagpur section Howrah–Nagpur–Mumbai line
- Platforms: 3
- Tracks: 5 ft 6 in (1,676 mm) broad gauge

Construction
- Structure type: At ground
- Parking: Available
- Cycle facilities: Available

Other information
- Status: Functioning
- Station code: TRO
- Zone(s): South East Central Railway zone
- Division(s): Nagpur

Passengers
- 5000

Services
Preceding station	Indian Railways	Following station
Kachewani Towards-east towards ?	South East Central Railway zone Bilaspur–Nagpur section of Howrah–Nagpur–Mumbai line	Mundikota TOWARDS WEST towards ?
Location

Tirora railway station (Marathi: तिरोडा रेल्वे स्थानक) serves Tirora city and surrounding villages in Gondia district in Maharashtra, India.
