= Central Organisation for Railway Electrification =

Indian transport agency

- Type: Subsidiary of Indian Railways
- Industry: Railways, electrification
- Founded: 1979; 47 years ago
- Headquarters: Prayagraj, Uttar Pradesh, India
- Area served: India
- Key people: Ashwini Vaishnaw (Railway Minister); Vinay Kumar Tirupati (Board Chairman)
- Products: Railway electrification
- Owner: Indian Railways
- Website: core.indianrailways.gov.in

The Central Organisation for Railway Electrification (CORE) is the unit of Indian Railways responsible for electrification of the network. The organisation, founded in 1979, is headquartered in Prayagraj, Uttar Pradesh. Project units operate in Ahmedabad, Ambala, Bengaluru, Chennai, Danapur, Jaipur, Lucknow, New Jalpaiguri and Secunderabad.

CORE headquarters has Electrical, Signal and Telecommunications (S&T), Civil Engineering, Stores, Personnel, Vigilance and Finance departments headed by Chief Project Directors.

In line with a 2018 government decision, Indian Railways aims to electrify all of its broad gauge network. As of 31 October 2026, 70,459 route kilometres (rkm) were electrified, which is 99.8% of the total broad-gauge network (70,591 rkm).

The entire electrified mainline rail network in India uses 25 kV AC; DC is used only for metros and trams.

== History ==
=== 1500 V DC ===
Railway electrification in India began with the first electric train (1500 V DC), between Bombay Victoria Terminus and Kurla on the Great Indian Peninsula Railway's (GIPR) Harbour Line, on 3 February 1925. Steep grades on the Western Ghats necessitated the introduction of electric traction on the GIPR to Igatpuri on the North East Line and to Pune on the South East Line. 1500 V DC traction was introduced on the suburban section of the Bombay, Baroda and Central India Railway between Colaba and Borivili on 5 January 1928, and between Madras Beach and Tambaram of the Madras and Southern Mahratta Railway on 11 May 1931, to meet growing traffic needs. The last sections of 1500 V DC in India, from Chhatrapati Shivaji Terminus, Mumbai to Panvel and Thane to Vashi, were upgraded to 25 kV AC in April 2016.

=== 3000 V DC ===
The electrification of the Howrah–Burdwan section of the Eastern Railway zone at 3000 V DC was completed in 1958. The first 3000 V DC EMU service began on the Howrah–Sheoraphuli section on 14 December 1957. The last section of 3000 V DC in India, from Howrah to Burdwan, was upgraded to 25 kV AC in 1968.

=== 25 kV AC ===
25 kV AC railway electrification emerged as an economical form of electrification as a result of research and trials in Europe, particularly on French Railways (SNCF). Indian Railways decided to adopt the 25 kV AC system of electrification as a standard in 1957, with SNCF as their consultant in the early stages, later taken over by the "50 c/s Group". The joint venture was founded in 1954 by several European railway manufacturers and was dedicated to the development and construction of locomotives powered by 50 Hz alternating current. It arranged the supply contracts for the WAM-1, WAG-1 and WAG-3 locomotives and their spare parts.

The first section electrified with the 25 kV AC system was Burdwan–Mughalsarai in 1957, followed by Tatanagar–Rourkela. Both of these sections were used for tests. The first section electrified for operational use was Raj Kharswan–Dongoaposi, on the South Eastern Railway zone, selected due to heavy freight traffic. The first electric train ran over this section on 15 December 1959. The first 25 kV AC EMUs, for Kolkata suburban service in Sealdah division, was introduced in 1963–4.

=== Organisation ===
The electrification office was established in Kolkata as the Project Office for Railway Electrification (PORE) in 1951 when electrification of the Howrah–Burdwan section of the Eastern Railway began. A general manager headed the Railway Electrification Organisation, established in Kolkata in 1959. In 1961, the Northern Railway zone electrification office (headed by an engineer-in-chief) was established in Allahabad for the electrification of the Mughalsarai–New Delhi section. Following the 1978 J. Raj Committee report, several electrification projects were included and a railway-electrification headquarters was established. Since most of the electrification projects at the time were in Central India and South India, the electrification headquarters was established in Nagpur under an additional general manager from 1982 to 1984. The headquarters was moved to Allahabad under the additional general manager in January 1985 and was renamed Central Organisation for Railway Electrification (CORE). A general manager was appointed in July 1987.

=== Electrification progress ===
Growth of Indian railway network and its electrification since 1951

The rate of electrification reached around 45% by 2015, when Indian Railways' Railway Board established its Environment Directorate for the coordination of environmental initiatives, resulting in a significant increase in the rate of electrification. In 2018, India's government set a target of achieving 100% electrification, with budget allocated for the task, and an initial target for completion in fiscal year 2021–2. The next year, IR set up a plan to achieve this goal in five fiscal years, with an aim to complete the project by December 2023. In December 2023, the target date was revised to the end of the 2023-4 fiscal year and later to the end of the 2024-5 fiscal year.

Trend of railway electrification commissioning in India
Period	Newly electrified (rkm)		Cumulative (rkm)
Period	whole period	annualised	Cumulative (rkm)
1925–1947	388	18	388
1947–1951	0	0	388
1951–1956	141	28	529
1956–1961	216	43	745
1961–1966	1,678	336	2,423
1966–1969	814	271	3,237
1969–1974	953	191	4,190
1974–1978	533	133	4,723
1978–1980	195	65	4,918
1980–1985	1,522	304	6,440
1985–1990	2,812	562	9,252
1990–1992	1,557	519	10,809
1992–1997	2,708	542	13,517
1997–2002	2,484	621	16,001
2002–2007	1,810	362	17,811
2007–2008	502 −168	334	18,145
2008–2009	797	797	18,942
2009–2010	1,117	1,117	20,059
2010–2014	741	185	21,801
2014–2015	1,176	1,176	22,997
2015–2016	1,502	1,502	24,479
2016–2017	1,646	1,646	26,125
2017–2018	4,087	4,087	30,212
2018–2019	5,276	5,276	35,488
2019–2020	4,378	4,378	39,866
2020–2021	6,015	6,015	45,881
2021–2022	6,366	6,366	52,247
2022–2023	6,565	6,565	58,812
2023–2024	7,188	7,188	66,000
2024–2025	2,701	2,701	68,701
2025–2026	1,172	1,172	69,873
2026–2027	586 (up to Oct 26)	586 (up to Oct 26)	70,459 (up to Oct 26)

== Status ==
Electrified network by state (broad gauge only) as of 31 October 2026
State	Total route km	Electrified route km	% Electrification (BG to BG)
Andaman and Nicobar Islands	0	0	N/A
Andhra Pradesh	3,841	3,841	100.00
Arunachal Pradesh	12	12	100.00
Assam	2,590	2,590	100.00
Bihar	4,188	4,188	100.00
Chandigarh	16	16	100.00
Chhattisgarh	1,354	1,354	100.00
Dadra and Nagar Haveli and Daman and Diu	0	0	N/A
Delhi	183	183	100.00
Goa	187	171	91.44
Gujarat	4,900	4,900	100.00
Haryana	2,026	2,026	100.00
Himachal Pradesh	78	78	100.00
Jammu & Kashmir	413	413	100.00
Jharkhand	2,585	2,585	100.00
Karnataka	3,739	3,623	96.89
Kerala	1,046	1,046	100.00
Ladakh	0	0	N/A
Lakshadweep	0	0	N/A
Madhya Pradesh	5,211	5,211	100.00
Maharashtra	5,993	5,993	100.00
Manipur	0	0	N/A
Meghalaya	9	9	100.00
Mizoram	2	2	100.00
Nagaland	11	11	100.00
Odisha	2,974	2,974	100.00
Puducherry	21	21	100.00
Punjab	2,369	2,369	100.00
Rajasthan	6,572	6,572	100.00
Sikkim	0	0	N/A
Tamil Nadu	3,929	3,929	100.00
Telangana	1,942	1,942	100.00
Tripura	271	271	100.00
Uttar Pradesh	9,658	9,658	100.00
Uttarakhand	378	378	100.00
West Bengal	4,042	4,042	100.00
Total (BG)	70,591	70,459	99.81

Electrified network by zone (broad gauge only) as of 31 October 2026
Zone	Total route km	Electrified route km	% Electrification (BG to BG)
CR	4,070	4,070	100.00
ER	2,837	2,837	100.00
ECR	4,479	4,479	100.00
ECoR	2,610	2,610	100.00
NR	7,601	7,601	100.00
NCR	4,425	4,425	100.00
NER	3,244	3,244	100.00
NFR	4,326	4,326	100.00
NWR	6,204	6,204	100.00
SR	5,071	5,071	100.00
SCR	3,175	3,175	100.00
SCoR	3,532	3,532	100.00
SER	2,753	2,753	100.00
SECR	2,523	2,523	100.00
SWR	3,465	3,333	96.19
WR	6,202	6,202	100.00
WCR	3,286	3,286	100.00
KRCL	738	738	100.00
Kolkata Metro	50	50	100.00
Total (BG)	70,591	70,459	99.81

== Other organisations involved in electrification ==
- RVNL – Handles significant, large-scale electrification projects.
- IRCON – Undertakes construction and electrification works.
- RITES – Involved in consultancy and execution.
- PGCIL – Assists in specific, high-voltage infrastructure tasks.
- Zonal Railways: Executing smaller, localized electrification projects.

== See also ==
- Future of rail transport in India
- List of railway electrification systems
- Project Unigauge
- Swachh Bharat Mission#Swachh Rail, Swachh Bharat
