= Devasena (Vakataka king) =

Vakataka king from 455 to 480

- Dharma-Mahārāja

Vakataka king of Vatsagulma
- Reign: c. 455 – 480 CE
- Predecessor: Sarvasena II
- Successor: Harishena
- House: Vakataka

Devasena (r. c. 455 – 480 CE) was a ruler of the Vatsagulma branch of the Vakataka dynasty. He was the son and successor of Sarvasena II.

The reign of Devasena seems to have witnessed a resurgence of the power and influence of the Vatsagulma Vakatakas, and the Ajanta inscriptions speak of King Devasena in glowing terms. Unlike his predecessors Pravarasena II and Sarvasena II, who bore the simple title of mahārāja, Devasena revived the title of dharmamahārāja which had last been used by Vindhyashakti II. It is possible that Devasena had expanded his kingdom south into Karnataka, for some of his copper plates were discovered in the Bidar district of northern Karnataka. In the east, Devasena established relations with the rising power of the Vishnukundins, giving his daughter in marriage to the Vishnukundin king Madhavavarman II Janashraya.

The reign of Devasena is also notable for the Hisse-Borala stone inscription. This inscription, which contains the date of year 380 of the Saka era (corresponding to 457/58 CE), is the only record that provides a firm chronological basis for Vakataka dynastic history. The inscription was discovered about 10 kilometers south of Devasena's capital of Vatsagulma (the present-day Washim) and records the construction of a water storage tank by a nobleman named Svamilladeva. The tank was named Sudarshana, which was also the name of a reservoir built by the children of Prabhavatigupta in her honor, and was possibly inspired by the famous Sudarshana lake of Junagadh in Gujarat. Ajay Mitra Shastri believes that Svamilladeva himself originally hailed from Gujarat and employed the Saka calendar era in the Hisse-Borala inscription due to the long-standing usage of that calendar era in Gujarat.

Devasena entrusted the administration of his kingdom to his minister Hastibhoja, who was both able and popular. We later also find Hastibhoja's son Varahadeva employed as the minister of Harishena, the son and successor of Devasena. Similarly, the noble Svamilladeva of the Hisse-Borala inscription is also encountered in Devasena's Bidar plates of his fifth regnal year and again in the Thalner plates of Harishena, where he is now employed as a dūtaka or liaison officer. It thus appears that the reign of Devasena saw the rise of several nobles and families to great status in the Vakataka court, and they continued to have influence in the reign of Harishena.
