= Traikutaka dynasty =

Former dynasty of India

- c. 388 CE–c. 456 CE
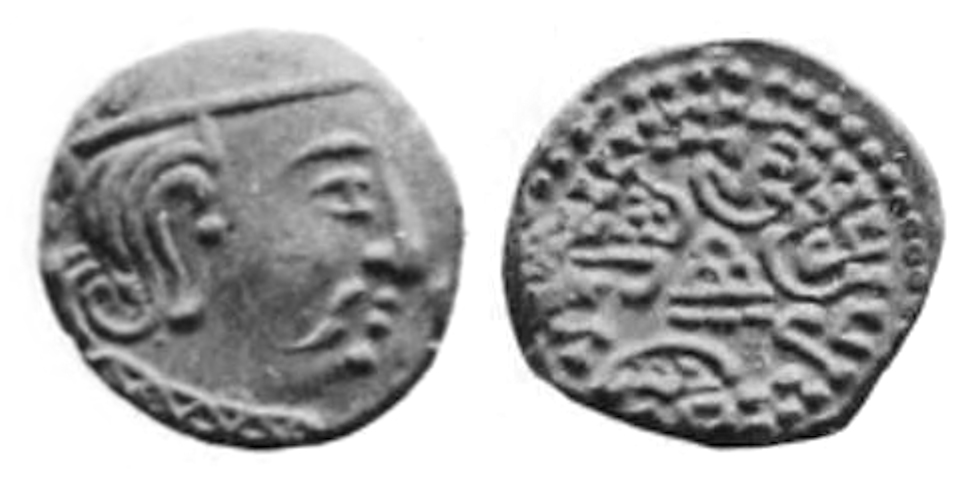
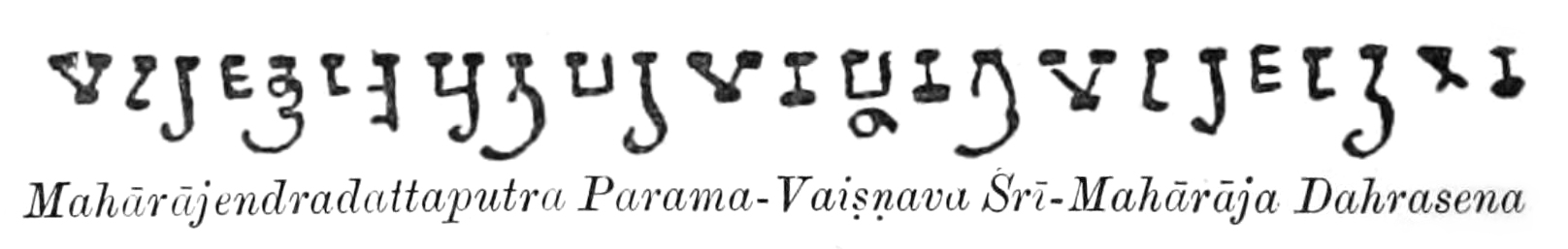
- Silver coin of king Dahrasena. Obv: Bust of king. Rev: Chaitya and star.Brahmi inscription: "The glorious king Dahrasena, foremost follower of Vishnu, and son of king Indradatta".

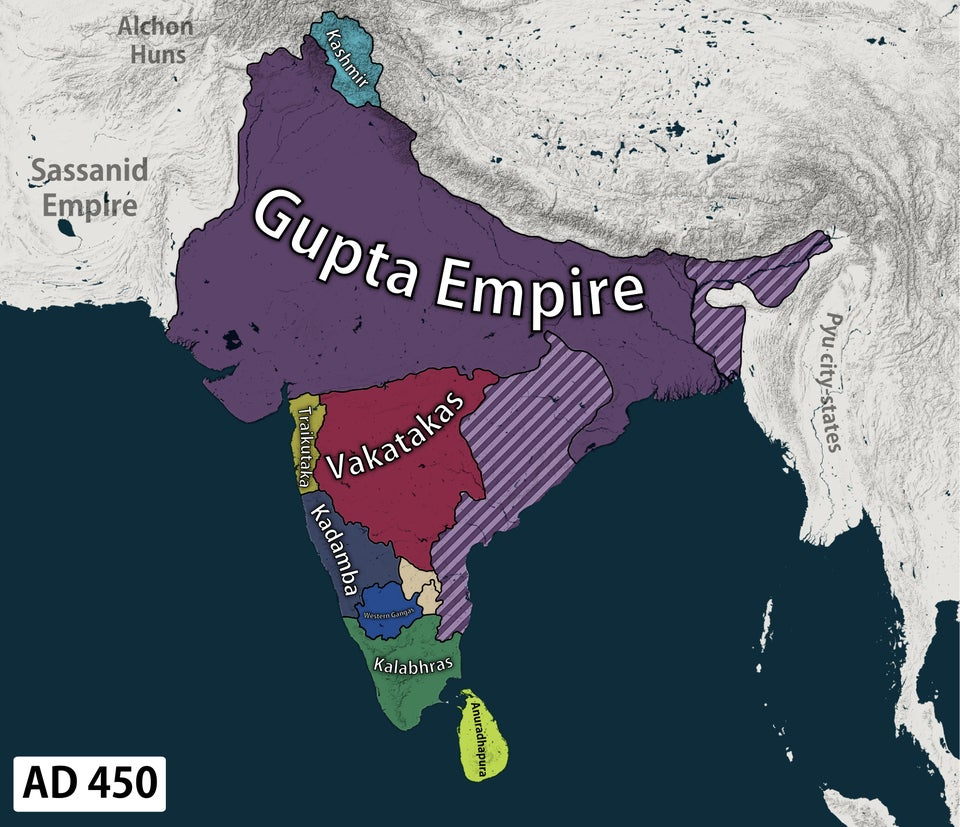
- Map of the territory of the Traikutakas (in yellow), along with their contemporaries, especially the Kadambas, the Vakatakas and the Gupta Empire.
- Common languages: Sanskrit; Maharashtri Prakrit
- Religion: Hinduism
- History
  - Established: c. 388 CE
  - Disestablished: c. 456 CE
Preceded by
Western Satraps
Succeeded by
Maitraka dynasty
Kalachuris of Mahishmati
Mauryas of Puri

The Traikutakas were a dynasty of Indian kings who ruled between 388 and 456. The name "Traikutakas" seems to be derived from the words for a three-peaked mountain ("Tri-kuta"). The Traikutakas are mentioned in Kalidasa's Raghuvamsa, in which they are located in the area of northern Kokan. The dominions of the Traikutakas further included Aparanta and northern Maharashtra.

The coins of the Traikutaras are found extensively in southern Gujarat, and southern Maharashtra beyond the Ghats. Their design is very close to that of the Western Satraps, from which they probably inherited some territories, and traces of the obverse legend with Greek letters can still be seen.

== History ==
Some scholars theorize that the Traikutakas were a branch of the Abhiras, and refer to them as the "Abhira-Traikutakas". These scholars assume that the Traikutaka records were dated in the so-called Chedi-Kalachuri era, starting in 249 CE. However, later epigraphic discoveries and numismatic evidence contradict this theory, and it is likely that the Traikutakas used the Shaka era.

Indradutta, Dahrasena & Vyaghrasena were well known kings from this dynasty. King Dahrasena expanded his realm, which soon bordered the Vakataka realm. This led to conflict and the Vakataka king Narendrasena, who with the help of his son & crown prince Prithivishena, probably defeated the Traikutikas, as later king Prithivishena's inscriptions refer to him twice rescuing the "sunken fortunes of his family".

Traikutikas were known for their Vaishnava faith. and Dharasena performed Ashvamedha Yajna too. During the reign of Maharaja Madhyamasena, the kingdom was invaded by the Vakataka king Harishena. The dynasty ended around AD 550, when Vikramasena, the last known king died. The Traikutakas were probably reduced to a vassal status under the Vishnukundins and had to accept Madhavavarman I's authority.

== Traikutaka rulers ==
The following Traikuta rulers are known from the coins and inscriptions of Gupta period-

- Maharaja Indradatta (AD 415-440, only mentioned on the coins of his son)
- Maharaja Dahrasena, son of Indradatta (A.D. 455), he performed Ashwamedha
- Maharaja Vyaghrasena, son of Dahrasena (A.D. 480)
- Maharaja Madhyamasena, son of Vyaghrasena (A.D. 504)
- Vikramasena, son of Madhyamasena (A.D. 533)

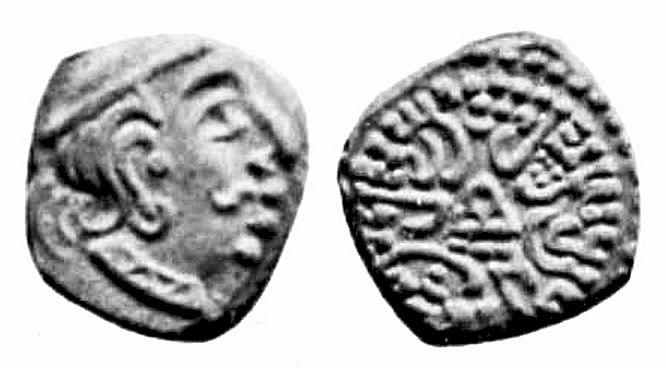
Coinage of Vyaghrasena, circa 480 AD, Traikutaka dynasty.

== See also ==
- Kalchuri Era
- Abhira
- Konkan

Timeline and cultural period	Indus plain (Punjab-Sapta Sindhu-Gujarat)	Gangetic Plain			Central India	Southern India
Timeline and cultural period	Indus plain (Punjab-Sapta Sindhu-Gujarat)	Upper Gangetic Plain (Ganga-Yamuna doab)	Middle Gangetic Plain	Lower Gangetic Plain	Central India	Southern India
IRON AGE
Culture	Late Vedic Period	Late Vedic Period; Painted Grey Ware culture	Late Vedic Period; Northern Black Polished Ware		Pre-history	
6th century BCE	Gandhara	Kuru-Panchala	Magadha		Adivasi (tribes)	Assaka
Culture	Persian-Greek influences	"Second Urbanisation"; Rise of Shramana movements Jainism - Buddhism - Ājīvika - Yoga			Pre-history	
5th century BCE	(Persian conquests)		Shaishunaga dynasty		Adivasi (tribes)	Assaka
4th century BCE	(Greek conquests)	Nanda empire				
HISTORICAL AGE
Culture	Spread of Buddhism				Pre-history	
3rd century BCE	Maurya Empire					Satavahana dynasty Sangam period (300 BCE – 200 CE); Early Cholas; Early Pandyan kingdom Cheras
Culture	Preclassical Hinduism (Note: Michaels (2004) p.39) - "Hindu Synthesis" (Note: Hiltebeitel (2002)) (ca. 200 BCE - 300 CE) (Note: Michaels (2004) p.39) (Note: Hiltebeitel (2002)); Epics - Puranas - Ramayana - Mahabharata - Bhagavad Gita - Brahma Sutras - Smarta Tradition; Mahayana Buddhism					
2nd century BCE	Indo-Greek Kingdom		Shunga Empire; Maha-Meghavahana Dynasty			Satavahana dynasty Sangam period (300 BCE – 200 CE); Early Cholas; Early Pandyan kingdom Cheras
1st century BCE	Indo-Greek Kingdom		Shunga Empire; Maha-Meghavahana Dynasty			Satavahana dynasty Sangam period (300 BCE – 200 CE); Early Cholas; Early Pandyan kingdom Cheras
1st century CE	Indo-Scythians; Indo-Parthians		Kuninda Kingdom			Satavahana dynasty Sangam period (300 BCE – 200 CE); Early Cholas; Early Pandyan kingdom Cheras
2nd century	Kushan Empire					Satavahana dynasty Sangam period (300 BCE – 200 CE); Early Cholas; Early Pandyan kingdom Cheras
3rd century	Kushano-Sasanian Kingdom; Western Satraps	Kushan Empire		Kamarupa kingdom	Adivasi (tribes)	Satavahana dynasty Sangam period (300 BCE – 200 CE); Early Cholas; Early Pandyan kingdom Cheras
Culture	"Golden Age of Hinduism"(ca. CE 320-650) (Note: Michaels (2004) p.40); Puranas - Kural; Co-existence of Hinduism and Buddhism					
4th century	Kidarites	Gupta Empire; Varman dynasty				Andhra Ikshvakus; Kalabhra dynasty Kadamba Dynasty; Western Ganga Dynasty
5th century	Hephthalite Empire	Alchon Huns				Vishnukundina; Kalabhra dynasty
6th century	Nezak Huns; Kabul Shahi; Maitraka				Adivasi (tribes)	Vishnukundina; Badami Chalukyas; Kalabhra dynasty
Culture	Late-Classical Hinduism (ca. CE 650-1100) (Note: Michaels (2004) p.41); Advaita Vedanta - Tantra; Decline of Buddhism in India					
7th century	Indo-Sassanids		Vakataka dynasty Empire of Harsha	Mlechchha dynasty	Adivasi (tribes)	Badami Chalukyas; Eastern Chalukyas; Pandyan kingdom (revival); Pallava
7th century	Karkota dynasty				Adivasi (tribes)	
8th century	Kabul Shahi	Pala Empire			Adivasi (tribes)	Eastern Chalukyas; Pandyan kingdom Kalachuri
9th century	Gurjara-Pratihara				Adivasi (tribes)	Rashtrakuta Empire; Eastern Chalukyas; Pandyan kingdom Medieval Cholas; Chera Perumals of Makkotai
10th century	Ghaznavids			Pala dynasty Kamboja-Pala dynasty	Adivasi (tribes)	Kalyani Chalukyas; Eastern Chalukyas; Medieval Cholas; Chera Perumals of Makkotai; Rashtrakuta
References and sources for table References Sources: Flood, Gavin D. (1996), An Introduction to Hinduism, Cambridge University Press; Hiltebeitel, Alf (2002), Hinduism. In: Joseph Kitagawa, "The Religious Traditions of Asia: Religion, History, and Culture", Routledge; Michaels, Axel (2004), Hinduism. Past and present, Princeton, New Jersey: Princeton University Press
