= Prithivishena I =

- Mahārāja

Vakataka king of Nandivardhana-Pravarapura
- Reign: c. 360 – 385 CE
- Predecessor: Rudrasena I
- Successor: Rudrasena II
- House: Vakataka

Prithivishena I (IAST: Pṛthivīṣeṇa; r. c. 360 – 385 CE) was a ruler of the Nandivardhana-Pravarapura branch of the Vakataka dynasty. He was the son and successor of Rudrasena I, the founder of the branch.

== Life ==
Despite the expansion of the Guptas during this time, the Vakatakas under Prithivishena seem to have retained considerable influence in Central India. Two inscriptions from the Bundelkhand region, found at Nachna or Nachne-ki-Talai in the old Jaso State and at Ganj in the old Ajaigarh State, refer to a local king named Vyaghradeva who claims to have been a vassal of the Vakataka king Prithivishena. There is some controversy over whether the Vakataka king "Prithivishena" mentioned in these inscriptions is Prithivishena I or Prithivishena II, who ruled several generations later. D.C. Sircar considers it most likely that Vyaghradeva was a vassal of Prithivishena I because the paleographical peculiarities of the Nachna and Ganj inscriptions are more similar to earlier Vakataka inscriptions, and also because it was the Guptas and not the Vakatakas who the overlords of the Bundelkhand region in the late fifth century when Prithivishena II was supposed to be ruling. A.S. Altekar likewise maintains that Vyaghradeva was a vassal of Prithivishena I and not Prithivishena II.

One of the most important events of Vakataka history took place during the later part of Prithivishena's reign when his son Rudrasena II married the Gupta princess Prabhavatigupta. This marriage secured an alliance between the two most powerful royal houses in India at the time. It was probably the Gupta emperor Chandragupta II who proposed the marriage of his daughter to the Vakataka prince, as he desired a cooperative ally on his southern border while his armies were operating in Malwa and Gujarat.

Prithivishena's contemporary to the south was his cousin Vindhyasena of the Basim or Vatsagulma branch of the Vakataka dynasty. The relationship between the two branches of the dynasty appears to have been quite cordial at this time, with the main branch headed by Prithivishena probably enjoying a nominal overlordship over the Vatsagulma branch. Prithivishena likely provided material aid to Vindhyasena as the latter carried out the conquest of the Kuntala country, and thus the rulers of the main branch came to be known as "lords of Kuntala."

In later Vakataka inscriptions, Prithivishena is described as a righteous conqueror and possessing the qualities of straightforwardness, honesty, humility, compassion, and purity of mind. He was called a dharmavijayin ("one who becomes victorious through virtue") and was compared to the epic hero Yudhishthira of the Mahabharata. Like his father Rudrasena I, Prithivishena was also a worshipper of Shiva. Prithivishena probably lived to old age and had a large family, for the Vakataka inscriptions describe him as a patriarch surrounded by sons and grandsons. Upon his death, he was succeeded by his son Rudrasena II.
