= Dharasena (ruler) =

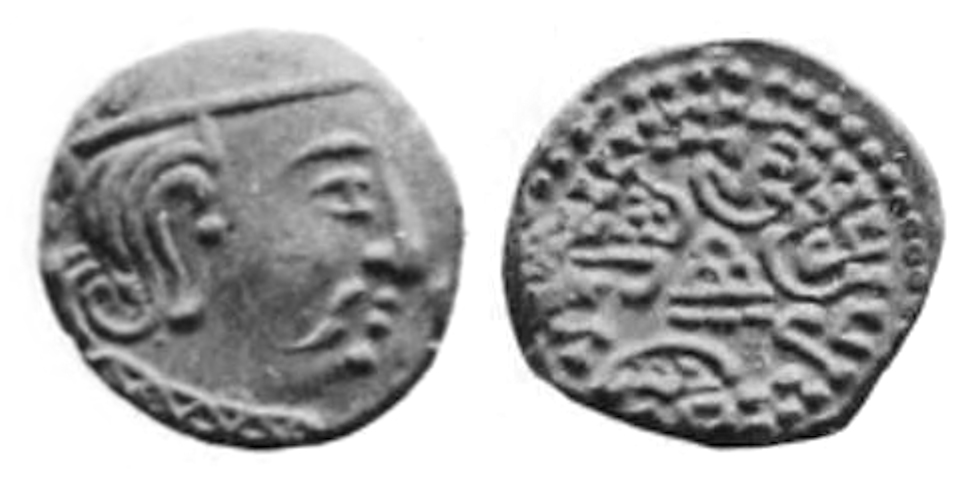
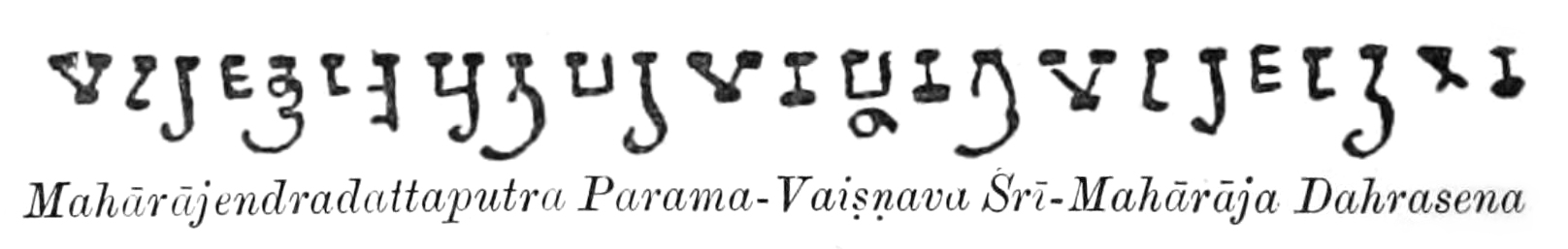
- Silver coin of king Dharasena. Obv: Bust of king. Rev: Chaitya and star.Brahmi inscription: "Maharajendradattaputra Parama-Vaisnava Sri-Maharaja Dahrasena" "The glorious king Dahrasena, foremost follower of Vishnu, and son of king Indradatta".

Traikutaka ruler
- Reign: c. 440 – c. 465 CE
- Predecessor: Indradatta
- Successor: Vyaghrasena
- Issue: Vyaghrasena
- Dynasty: Traikutaka dynasty
- Father: Indradatta
- Religion: Vaishnavism(Hinduism)

Dharasena was a Traikutaka ruler of the Konkan coast. He was the son of the Traikutaka ruler Indradatta and succeeded him as king. He is known to have performed an ashwamedha horse sacrifice and was succeeded by his son Vyaghrasena.

== Reign ==
King Dharasena expanded his realm, which soon bordered the Vakataka realm. This led to conflict and the Vakataka king Narendrasena, who with the help of his son & crown prince Prithivishena, probably defeated the Traikutikas, as later king Prithivishena's inscriptions refer to him twice rescuing the "sunken fortunes of his family".

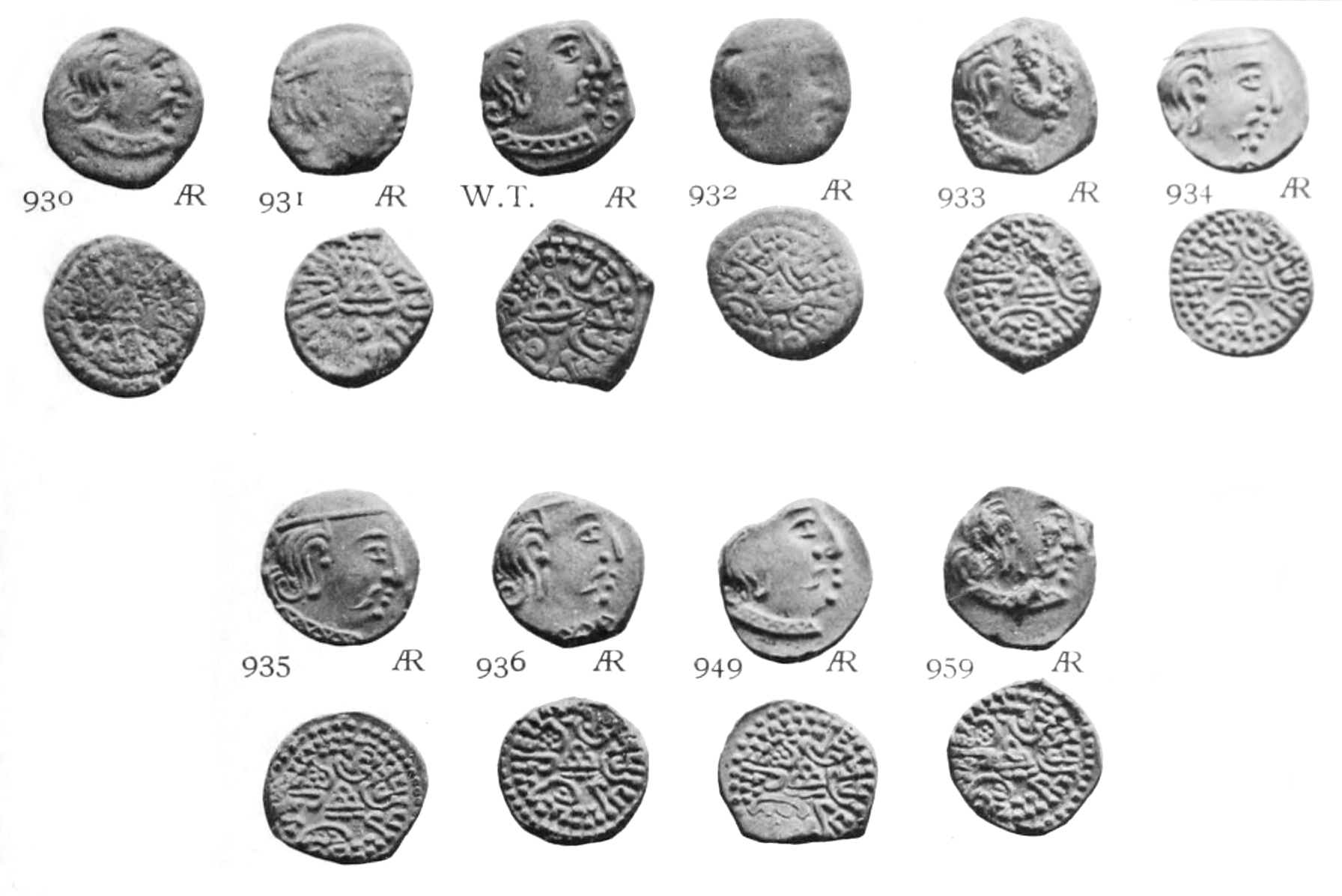
Coin types of Dharasena.

== See also ==
- Abhira dynasty
- Konkan
- Kumaragupta I
