= Vindhyashakti =

Vakataka king from 250 to 275

Vakataka king
- Reign: c. 250 – 275
- Successor: Pravarasena I
- House: Vakataka

Vindhyashakti (r. c. 250 – 275) was the founder of the Vakataka dynasty and ruler of Vidisha according to the Puranas. His name might be derived from the goddess Vindhyavasini, or it could be a title or biruda referring to his patrimony in the Vindhya mountains rather than a personal name.

No inscription or record belonging to the reign of Vindhyashakti has been discovered so far. In the much later Ajanta Cave XVI inscription of the time of Harishena, Vindhyashakti is described as the "banner of the Vakataka family" and as a dvija or "twice-born". It is stated in this inscription that he added to his power by fighting great battles and that he had a large cavalry. Vindhyashakti's majesty was compared to that of the gods Indra and Vishnu. However, no regal title is prefixed to his name in this inscription.

The Puranas make reference to Vindhyashakti and his dynasty, but their historical reliability is questionable. The Vayu Purana gives Vindhyashakti a fantastically long reign of 96 years, and the Puranic texts refer to Naga kings ruling between the time of Vindhyashakti and his son Pravira. It appears from the Puranas that Vindhyashakti was a ruler of Vidisha in present-day Madhya Pradesh, but that is not considered to be correct.

Different authors have placed Vindhyashakti's original home in a variety of places including in the southern Deccan, Madhya Pradesh and Malwa. K. P. Jayaswal considers Bagat, a village in the Jhansi district as the home of Vakatakas. V. V. Mirashi points out that the earliest mention of the name Vakataka occurs in an inscription found on a fragment of a pillar at Amaravati which records the gift of a Grihapati (householder) named Vakataka and his two wives. However, there is no evidence to show that the personal name of this man had anything to do with the dynastic name of the Vakatakas or that his original home was in the Deccan, as he was visiting the Buddhist establishment of Amaravati on pilgrimage.

Vindhyashakti seems to have been largely forgotten or ignored after his death, perhaps overshadowed by his more illustrious son and successor, Pravarasena I. All of the copper plates of the Vakataka dynasty begin the family genealogy with Pravarasena I instead of Vindhyashakti.
