= Sarvasena II =

- Mahārāja

Vakataka king of Vatsagulma
- Reign: c. 415 – 455 CE
- Predecessor: Pravarasena II
- Successor: Devasena
- House: Vakataka

Sarvasena II (r. c. 415 – 455 CE) was a ruler of the Vatsagulma branch of the Vakataka dynasty. He was the son and successor of Pravarasena II.

Sarvasena ascended the throne when he was just eight years old. His identity was not known to early historians of the Vakatakas, because the preserved portion of the Ajanta inscription did not provide a name for the young son and successor of Pravarasena II of Vatsagulma. However, it is now clear that Sarvasena II was the successor of Pravarasena II and should be identified with the unnamed king of the Ajanta genealogy.

Like his father, Sarvasena used the title of Maharaja instead of the title Dharma-Maharaja which was used by his more illustrious ancestors. Sarvasena is also not known to have issued any inscriptions of his own. For these reasons, Hans Bakker believes that Sarvasena was likely a subordinate of the main Vakataka branch ruling from Nandivardhana and Pravarapura. Ajay Mitra Shastri, on the other hand, views Sarvasena as a more powerful ruler who had substantial influence over the kingdom of the Kadambas to the south. He proposes that Sarvasena II is to be identified with the King Sarvasena who is mentioned to have consecrated the Kadamba king Simhavarman, son of Vishnuvarman.

Sarvasena had a fairly long reign which seems to have been mostly peaceful. He is described as a good ruler in later Vakataka records, and his chief concern seems to have been the welfare of his subjects rather than warfare with his neighbors. Sarvasena was succeeded by his son Devasena, probably in the first half of the 450s.
