= Indradatta (Traikutaka ruler) =

- Maharajadhiraja; Parama-vaișnava
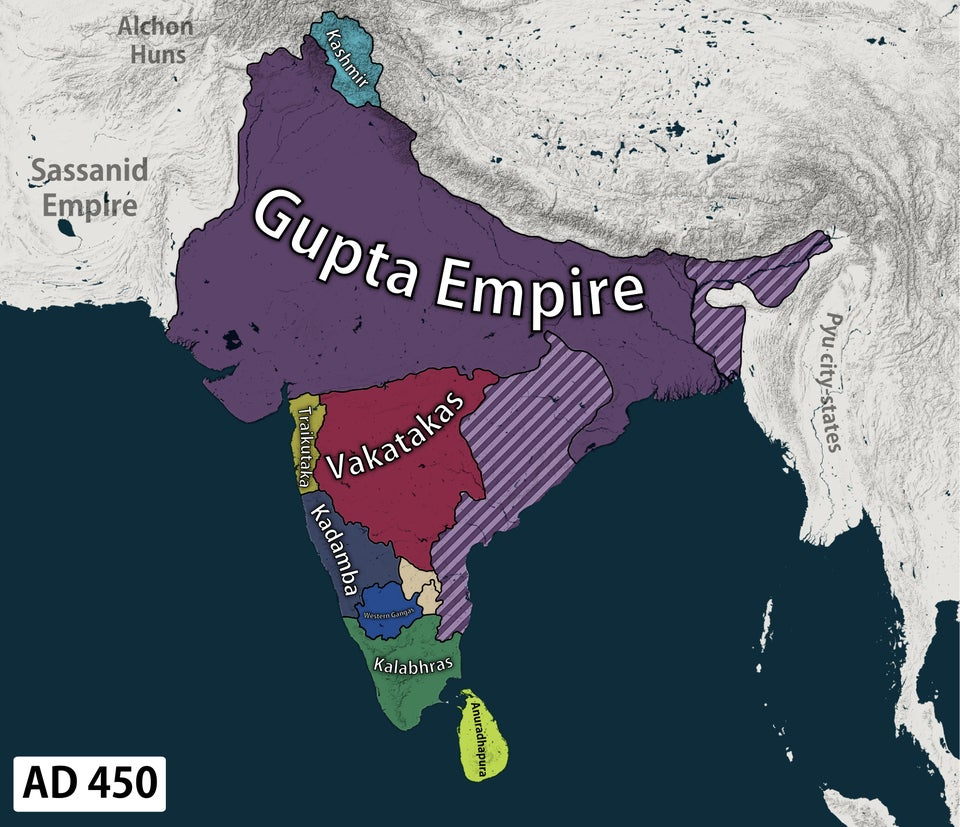

Traikutaka ruler
- Reign: c. 415 – c. 440 CE
- Predecessor: Position Established
- Successor: Dharasena
- Issue: Dharasena
- Dynasty: Traikutaka dynasty
- Religion: Vaishnavism

Indradatta was a Traikutaka ruler of the Kokan coast. He is said to have completely absorbed the Abhira dynasty. He was succeeded by his son Dharasena. His historicity is uncertain, as the name is primarily attested from coin legends and may represent an epithet rather than a historical figure.

== Reign ==
During the early 5th century CE, the Abhiras seem to have been absorbed into the rising Traikūṭaka authority, and Indradatta is known to be a great early ruler of the latter dynasty. His life is largely deduced from the inscriptions found on the coins minted by his son, Dharasena, which praise him as a pious Vaiṣṇava. Though conventional sources such as the Vāyupurāṇa attribute a 67-year reign to the Abhiras, historian V.V. Mirashi advocated for a longer period of 167 years, which would place Indradatta's ascension at about 417 CE. Dharasena's accession is placed between 438 and 448 CE, indicating Indradatta could have reigned for more than two decades.

== See also ==
- Abhira dynasty
- Konkan
- Kumaragupta I
