= Vindhyasena =

- Dharma-Mahārāja

Vakataka king of Vatsagulma
- Reign: c. 355 – 400 CE
- Predecessor: Sarvasena
- Successor: Pravarasena II
- House: Vakataka

Vindhyasena (r. c. 355 – 400 CE), also known as Vindhyashakti II, was a ruler of the Vatsagulma branch of the Vakataka dynasty. He was the son and successor of Sarvasena I.

== Life ==
Vindhyasena seems to have enjoyed quite a long reign, as he issued a charter from his capital of Vatsagulma in his thirty-seventh regnal year. The charter records the grant of a village in the Nandikata region which is identified with Nanded. An inscription at Ajanta from the time of Harishena, a later Vakataka monarch, records Vindhyasena's victory against the rulers of the Kuntala in northern Karnataka, likely the Kadambas. Vindhyasena ruled over a fairly extensive kingdom that included the southern part of Berar (Vidarbha) and the districts of Nasik, Ahmednagar, Pune, and Satara, as well as the Marathwada region.

Vindhyasena's contemporary to the north was his cousin Prithivishena I of the main Vakataka branch. The relationship between the two branches of the dynasty appears to have been quite cordial at this time, with the main branch probably enjoying a nominal overlordship over the Vatsagulma branch. Prithivishena likely provided material aid to Vindhyasena as the latter carried out the conquest of the Kuntala country. Upon his death, Vindhyasena was succeeded by his son Pravarasena II.
