= Rudrasena I (Vakataka king) =

- Mahārāja

Vakataka king of Nandivardhana-Pravarapura
- Reign: c. 335 – 360 CE
- Predecessor: Pravarasena I
- Successor: Prithivishena I
- House: Vakataka
- Father: Prince Gautamiputra
- Mother: A daughter of the Bharashiva king Bhavanaga

Rudrasena I (r. c. 335 – 360 CE) was a ruler of the Nandivardhana-Pravarapura branch of the Vakataka dynasty. He was the grandson and one of the successors of Pravarasena I.

Not much is known about Rudrasena's life and reign. His father was Prince Gautamiputra and his mother was probably a daughter of the Bharashiva king Bhavanaga, as later Vakataka inscriptions describe Rudrasena as a grandson of Bhavanaga. Rudrasena was also described as a devout worshipper of Mahabhairava, a fierce form of Shiva. It is possible that Rudrasena's Shaivite leanings were influenced by his maternal relatives, who were noted for their devotion to Shiva.

Some scholars in the past have identified Rudrasena with the king named Rudradeva in the Allahabad pillar inscription, where Rudradeva is described as one of the rulers of Aryavarta who were exterminated by Samudragupta. A.S. Altekar points out that this identification is based only on a superficial resemblance of names and is quite unlikely for a number of reasons. First, the region of Aryavarta pertains to northern India, whereas the dominions of the Vakatakas were strictly speaking located in the Dakshinapatha or Deccan. Second, there was not much occasion for rivalry between the Guptas and Vakatakas because their spheres of influence were quite distinct from one another. In fact, even during Samudragupta's famous southern expedition, there was no direct conflict between the Guptas and Vakatakas. Finally, if Rudrasena had been killed by Samudragupta, it would be extremely unlikely that his son Prthivishena would accept a Gupta princess (Prabhavatigupta) as his daughter-in-law.

Unlike his illustrious father Pravarasena, Rudrasena never assumed the imperial title of Samrāṭ and was instead referred to only as Mahārāja. Due to the division of Pravarasena's empire upon his death, none of his successors could claim the imperial title. However, this does not mean that Rudrasena had lost his independence or was under the suzerainty of some other, more powerful ruler. In the Deccan especially, the title Mahārāja was used by powerful and independent kings.

The capital of Rudrasena's kingdom was Nandivardhana, which is probably identical to Nagardhan near Ramtek, about 13 miles north of Nagpur. This city would remain an important political center in the Vidarbha region for several centuries. Rudrasena is also known to have constructed a Shiva temple at Deotek, about 50 miles southeast of Nagpur. The records of the Vakataka dynasty assert that their family's treasury, army, and prestige were "continuously on the increase" for 100 years at the time when Prithvishena I (the son and successor of Rudrasena) ascended the throne, which suggests that the reign of Rudrasena saw the continued maintenance of Vakataka power and influence.
