= Harishena =

Vakataka king from 480 to 510

- Dharma-Mahārāja

Vakataka king
- Reign: c. 480 – 510
- Predecessor: Devasena
- House: Vakataka

Harishena (r. c. 480 – 510) was the last known ruler of the Vatsagulma branch of the Vakataka dynasty. He succeeded his father Devasena. Harishena was a great patron of Buddhist architecture, art and culture, with the World Heritage monument of Ajanta being his greatest legacy. He is also credited with many conquests. The end of Harishena's reign and the ultimate fate of the Vatsagulma branch is shrouded in mystery, as it seems the Vakataka dynasty came to an end not long after the death of Harishena.

== Reign ==
Harishena was the most powerful of the Vakataka rulers of the Vatsagulma branch. The Ajanta cave inscription of Harishena's minister Varahadeva describes the king's influence extending over many countries including Kuntala (probably referring to the kingdom of the Kadambas), Avanti (the region of western Malwa), Kalinga, Koshala, Lata, Andhra, and Trikuta (referring to the territories of the Traikutakas around the northern Konkan). In the west, the Traikutaka dynasty seems to have come to an end around 495 following the death of Vyaghrasena, who had no known successors, and the termination of this line of rulers may have been due to conquest by Harishena. In the north, it seems that part of the Anupa region was included in Harishena's kingdom, as the Bagh caves of this region are closely related to those of Ajanta in style and date. The extent of the Vakataka empire under Harishena was thus even greater than what it had been during the reign of Emperor Pravarasena I.

Harishena's contemporary in the Nandivardhana-Pravarapura branch of the Vakataka dynasty was Prithivishena II, the last king of that branch. Nothing definite is known about the relations between the Vakatakas of Vatsagulma and the Vakatakas of Nandivardhana-Pravarapura during this time. However, it seems that Harishena assumed leadership over both branches of the Vakataka dynasty following the death of Prithivishena II. The greater wealth and importance of the Vatsagulma branch compared to the Nandivardhana-Pravarapura branch is reflected in the archaeological record of this period. Whereas in the first six decades of the fifth century there is a wealth of material from the kingdom of Nandivardhana-Pravarapura, there is very little that can be attributed to the later period. In stark contrast, the period after the 460s saw the kingdom of Vatsagulma producing its own stunning art and architecture, which surpassed that of its contemporaries in the Nandivardhana-Pravarapura branch.

== Ajanta Caves ==
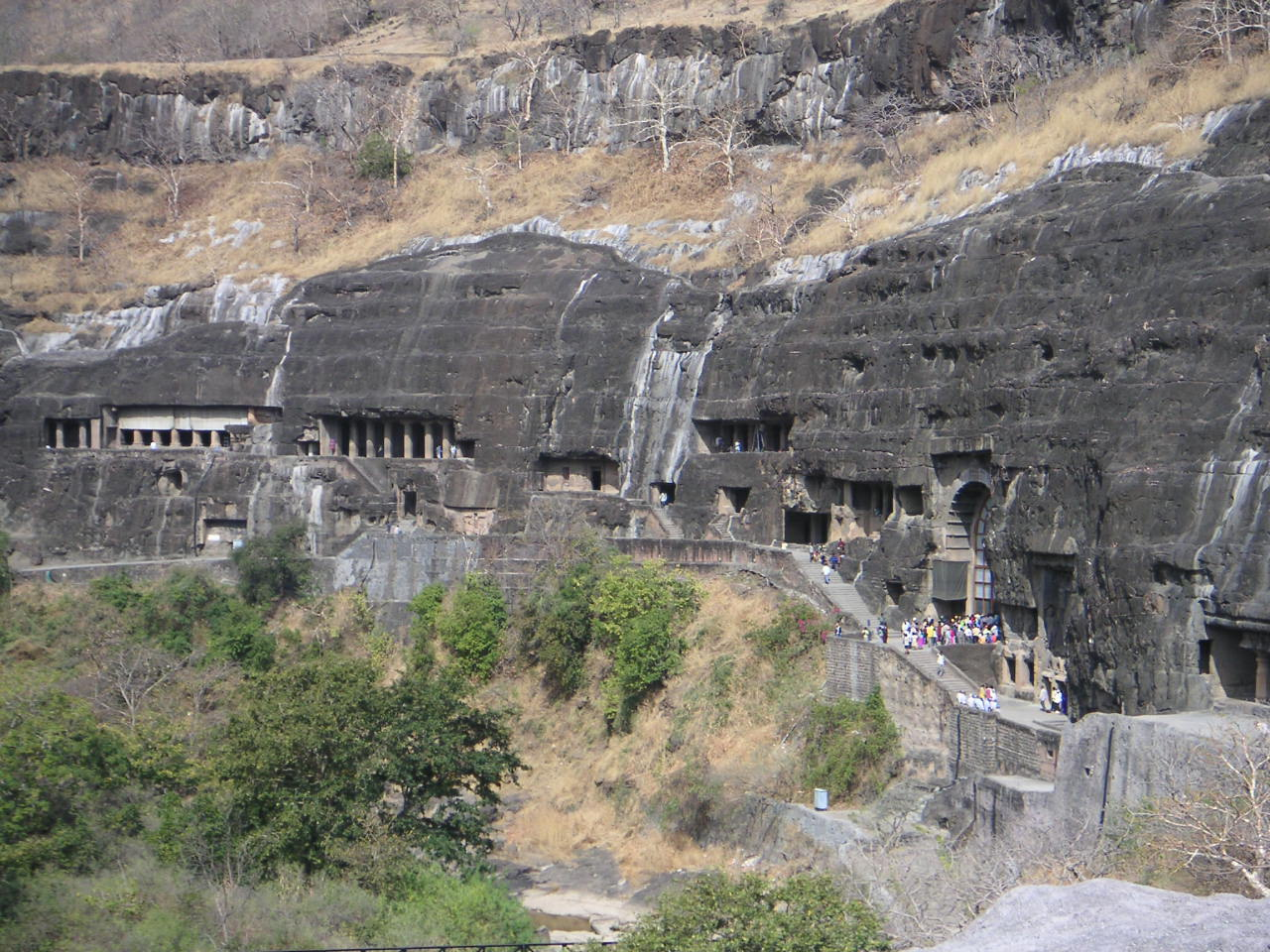
Many of the monuments in the Ajanta Caves (pictured above) date to the reign of Harishena.

The monumental rock-cut caves at Ajanta offer the greatest examples of Vakataka art and architecture. The Ajanta Caves are best known for their wall paintings, which are among the most magnificent that survive from ancient India; they have been described as representing "the pinnacle of an ancient tradition." According to art historian Walter Spink, all the rock-cut monuments of Ajanta excluding Caves 9, 10, 12, 13 and 15A were built during Harishena's reign, although his view is not universally accepted. Varahadeva, the minister of Harishena, excavated the rock-cut vihara of Cave 16 at Ajanta. Three of the Buddhist caves at Ajanta, including two viharas (Caves 16 and 17) and a chaitya (Cave 19) were excavated and decorated with painting and sculptures during the reign of Harishena.

== Successors and the end of Vakataka rule ==
Harishena seems to have been succeeded by two rulers whose names are not known. Despite the power and influence that Harishena enjoyed during his lifetime, the disintegration and collapse of the Vakataka kingdom seems to have occurred very rapidly after Harishena's death in about 510. The circumstances surrounding the fall of the Vakataka kingdom remain unclear. By about 550, the Chalukyas of Badami occupied the greater portion of the erstwhile Vakataka territories. However, as the Chalukya records do not make any reference to a conflict with the Vakatakas, it seems that the Vakatakas had already lost power prior to the Chalukya expansion. The early Chalukya kings waged war against the Nalas in Vidarbha and the southern parts of Madhya Pradesh, and thus the Nalas may have extended their sway over former Vakataka territories in the east. The Kalachuris in the north and the Kadambas in the south also seem to have expanded their control over lands formerly under Vakataka sovereignty during the weak rule of Harishena's successors.
