= Sarvasena I =

- Dharma-Mahārāja

Vakataka king of Vatsagulma
- Reign: c. 325 – 355 CE
- Predecessor: Pravarasena I
- Successor: Vindhyasena
- House: Vakataka

Sarvasena I (r. c. 325 – 355 CE) was a king of the Vakataka dynasty and the founder of the Vatsagulma branch of the line. He took on the title of Dharma-Maharaja and was likely an accomplished poet in Prakrit. Later writers extolled his lost work, the Harivijaya, and some of his verses were also included in the Gathasattasai. Sarvasena was succeeded by his son Vindhyasena.
