= Pravarasena II of Vatsagulma =

- Mahārāja

Vakataka king of Vatsagulma
- Reign: c. 400 – 415 CE
- Predecessor: Vindhyasena
- Successor: Sarvasena II
- House: Vakataka

Pravarasena II (r. c. 400 – 415 CE) was a ruler of the Vatsagulma branch of the Vakataka dynasty. He was the son and successor of Vindhyasena.

Pravarasena II seems to have had a relatively short and uneventful reign. He probably died early, as he was succeeded by a son who was only eight years old. For a long time, the name of this young successor was unknown, as his name was not present in the preserved portion of the Ajanta inscription, which provided the genealogy of the Vakataka dynasty. However, it is now known that Pravarasena II's son and successor was Sarvasena II.

Unlike his illustrious ancestors who used the title Dharma-Maharaja, Pravarasena II used Maharaja, a practice continued by Sarvasena II. This fact, combined with the total absence of inscriptions from the reigns of either Pravarasena II or his son, leads Hans Bakker to believe that the Vatsagulma branch of the Vakataka dynasty was subordinate to the Nandivardhana-Pravarapura branch during the first half of the fifth century.
