= Narendrasena =

Vakataka king

- Maharaja
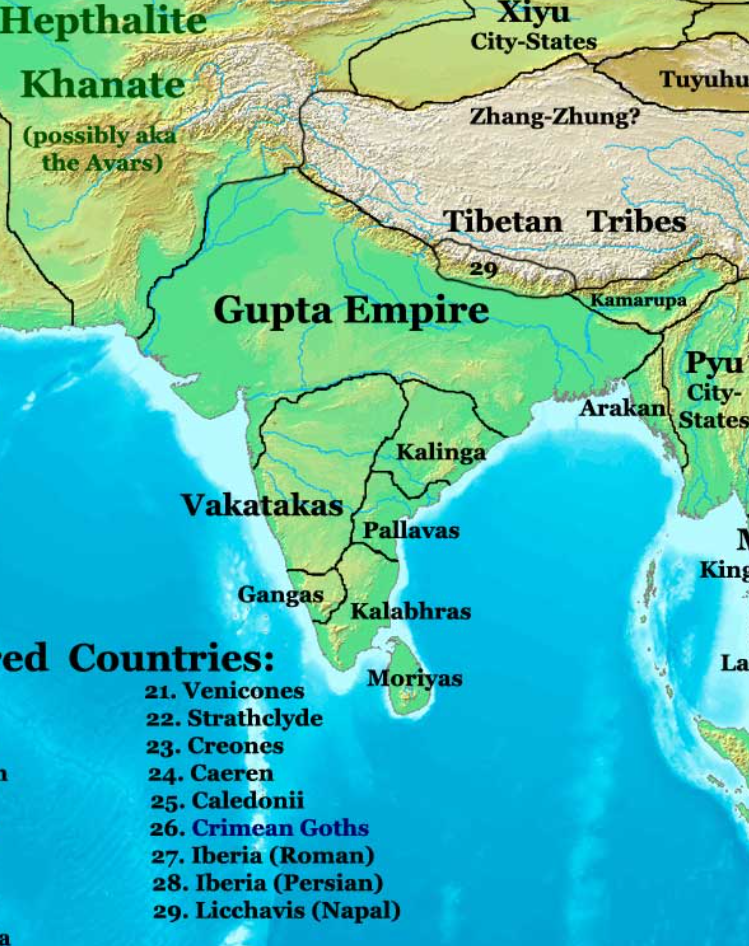
- Vakatakas in 477 CE, during the reign of Narendrasena

Vakataka king of Nandivardhana-Pravarapura
- Reign: c. 455 – 480 CE
- Predecessor: Pravarasena II
- Successor: Prithivishena II
- Issue: Prithivishena II
- Dynasty: Vakataka
- Father: Pravarasena II
- Mother: Ajjhitabhattarika
- Religion: Vaishnavism

Narendrasena (r. c. 455 – 480 CE) was a ruler of the Nandivardhana-Pravarapura branch of the Vakataka dynasty. He succeeded his father Pravarasena II as Maharaja.

== Early life ==
Narendrasena was possibly born to Ajnakabhattarika, who may have been the chief queen of Pravarasena II and is mentioned as the mother of "Narindaraja" (possibly referring to Narendrasena) in a charter from Pravarasena's 16th regnal year. Sometime during his father's reign, Narendrasena was married to a princess named Ajjhitabhattarika who was described as the daughter of the "king of Kuntala". It is not known for certain who this "king of Kuntala" was, but he is often identified with the Kadamba king Kakusthavarman who is known to have married his daughters into several prominent royal families.

== Reign ==
The death of Pravarasena II may have been followed by a succession struggle, from which Narendrasena emerged victorious. The Vakataka records state that Narendrasena had to "regain the fortunes of his family" after suffering some undisclosed calamity, which several historians have interpreted as referring to this supposed war of succession after his father's death. However, A.S. Altekar argues that the records instead refer to an invasion of the Vakataka realm by the Nala king Bhavadattavarman of the Bastar region, who is known to have penetrated deep into Vidarbha and occupied Nandivardhana, the erstwhile Vakataka capital. Altekar supposes that Narendrasena successfully drove out the Nalas from his kingdom shortly after the death of Bhavadattavarman.

The inscriptions of Prithivishena II, Narendrasena's son and successor, assert that Narendrasena's authority was acknowledged by the rulers of Kosala, Mekala, and Malava. Many historians regard this claim to be an empty boast or exaggeration, but it is possible that Narendrasena had indeed greatly expanded the Vakataka sphere of influence. The Gupta Empire, then the hegemonic power in northern India, was embroiled in a war with invading Huna hordes, which left the Vakatakas free to expand into central India. It is also possible that Narendrasena's prosecution of the war against the Nalas resulted in the further extension of Vakataka authority, especially in the area around present-day Chhattisgarh. Narendrasena might have invaded the Nala homeland and sacked their capital, for Skandavarman, a brother and successor of Bhavadattavarman, is said to have retrieved the fortunes of his family and had to repopulate his capital.

=== War with Guptas ===
The death of Pravarasena II may have triggered a succession struggle, with Narendrasena ultimately emerging as the victor. Vakataka inscriptions suggest that Narendrasena had to "regain the fortunes of his family" following an unspecified calamity, which many historians interpret as a reference to the aftermath of the succession conflict. However, A.S. Altekar proposes an alternative explanation, suggesting that the records actually describe an invasion by the Nala king Bhavadattavarman of Bastar and Kumaragupta of Gupta Empire, who were known to have advanced into Vidarbha and captured Nandivardhana, the former Vakataka capital. Around 445 CE, during the final years of Kumaragupta I's reign, Vakataka king Narendrasena reclaimed his former capital by driving out the combined forces of the Guptas and Nalas. The recapture marked a brief Vakataka resurgence amid Gupta expansion and Nala ambitions in central India. The inscriptions of Prithivishena II, the son and successor of Narendrasena, claim that Narendrasena's authority was recognized by the ruler of Malava captured form local feudatories of Guptas or from Skandagupta.

While many historians view this assertion as an exaggerated boast, it is possible that Narendrasena did significantly extend the Vakataka influence. During this period, the Gupta Empire, the dominant power in northern India, was preoccupied with defending against Huna invasions, which may have allowed the Vakatakas to expand their territory in central India. However, Malwa wasn't under Vakataka for long as it was recaptured by Skandagupta
