= Pravarasena I =

Vakataka emperor from 275 to 335

- Samrāṭ

Vakataka emperor
- Reign: c. 275–335
- Predecessor: Vindhyashakti
- Successor: Rudrasena I; Sarvasena I
- Issue: Gautamiputra; Sarvasena I; Two other unnamed sons
- House: Vakataka

Pravarasena I (r. c. 275 – 335) was the successor of Vindhyashakti, the founder of the Vakataka dynasty. He was the first and only Vakataka ruler to be called Samrāṭ, meaning emperor or universal ruler. In addition to the title of Samrāṭ, Pravarasena I also bore the titles Dharmamaharaja and Haritiputra, both of which are attested in inscriptions of his descendants. Under his reign, the Vakatakas were established as a major power in the Deccan, where they would rule for almost two centuries after Pravarasena's death.

== Reign ==
No inscription or record from Pravarasena's reign has been discovered. Information on his reign and accomplishments is dependent on later records of the Vakataka dynasty as well as from the Puranic literary tradition. The Puranas are unanimous in giving Pravarasena (or "Pravira", as he is called in the Puranic texts) a long reign of 60 years. That Pravarasena lived to old age seems to be supported by the fact that Pravarasena's grandson was among the successors to his empire.

Although the details of Pravarasena's military campaigns are unknown, their number and significance can be gauged from the many Vedic sacrifices that he is said to have performed. Pravarasena performed no less than four ashvamedha horse sacrifices during his reign, and each one may have marked the termination of a successful campaign. As an orthodox Hindu and champion of the Brahmanical religious tradition, Pravarasena also performed many other Vedic sacrifices including the Agnishṭoma, Āptoryāma, Jyotishṭoma, Bṛihaspatisava, Sādyaskra, Ukthya, Shoḍaśin, and Atirātra sacrifices. The Vakataka rulers, including Pravarasena I, have been identified in inscriptions as Brahmans belonging to the Vishnuvriddha gotra. At the end of his career, after he had achieved overlordship over the Deccan, Pravarasena celebrated the Vājapeya sacrifice and formally assumed the imperial title of Samrāṭ.

To the north of Pravarasena's empire were the powerful Bharashiva Naga kings, who were a strong force in the central regions of India. Pravarasena forged an important political alliance with King Bhavanaga of the Bharashiva dynasty by marrying his son Gautamiputra to Bhavanaga's daughter. This alliance secured the northern border of the Vakataka dominions and left Pravarasena free to expand into the south. It is also possible that Pravarasena performed his multiple ashvamedha sacrifices in imitation of the Bharashiva Nagas, for the latter are said to have performed no fewer than ten ashvamedha sacrifices.

Pravarasena's capital was called Kanchanaka and has been identified with Nachna in the Panna district of Madhya Pradesh, where several early Vakataka inscriptions and contemporary structural remains have been found. This suggests that Pravarasena's original power base was in the Vindhyan region of present-day Madhya Pradesh, from which the Vakatakas spread southward into Maharashtra. At its greatest extent, Pravarasena's empire covered almost the whole of the Deccan between the Narmada and Krishna rivers, while his sphere of influence extended over Malwa, Gujarat, Andhradesha, and southern Koshala. Pravarasena had four sons who were appointed as viceroys over different provinces of his empire, and these provinces seem to have become independent following Pravarasena's death.

== Legacy ==
Pravarasena's eldest son was Prince Gautamiputra, but he predeceased his father. Gautamiputra's son Rudrasena thus succeeded Pravarasena upon the latter's death, with Rudrasena and his descendants forming the "main" branch of the Vakataka dynasty ruling over northern Berar and parts of Madhya Pradesh. Another one of Pravarasena's sons, Sarvasena, was likely a viceroy of southern Berar and the Marathwada region of Maharashtra. Upon his father's death, Sarvasena founded a branch of the Vakataka dynasty at Vatsagulma (identified with Washim). Nothing is known about the branches set up by the other two sons.

All of the copper plates of the Vakataka rulers begin the family genealogy with Pravarasena instead of Vindhyashakti. None of Pravarasena's successors adopted his title of Samrāṭ, instead contenting themselves with the title of Mahārāja. Pravarasena's imperial title, his large empire, and his performance of Vedic sacrifices made him stand out as a ruler in the eyes of posterity.
