= Vakataka dynasty =

Indian dynasty in the Deccan (250–510)

- c. 250–c. 510
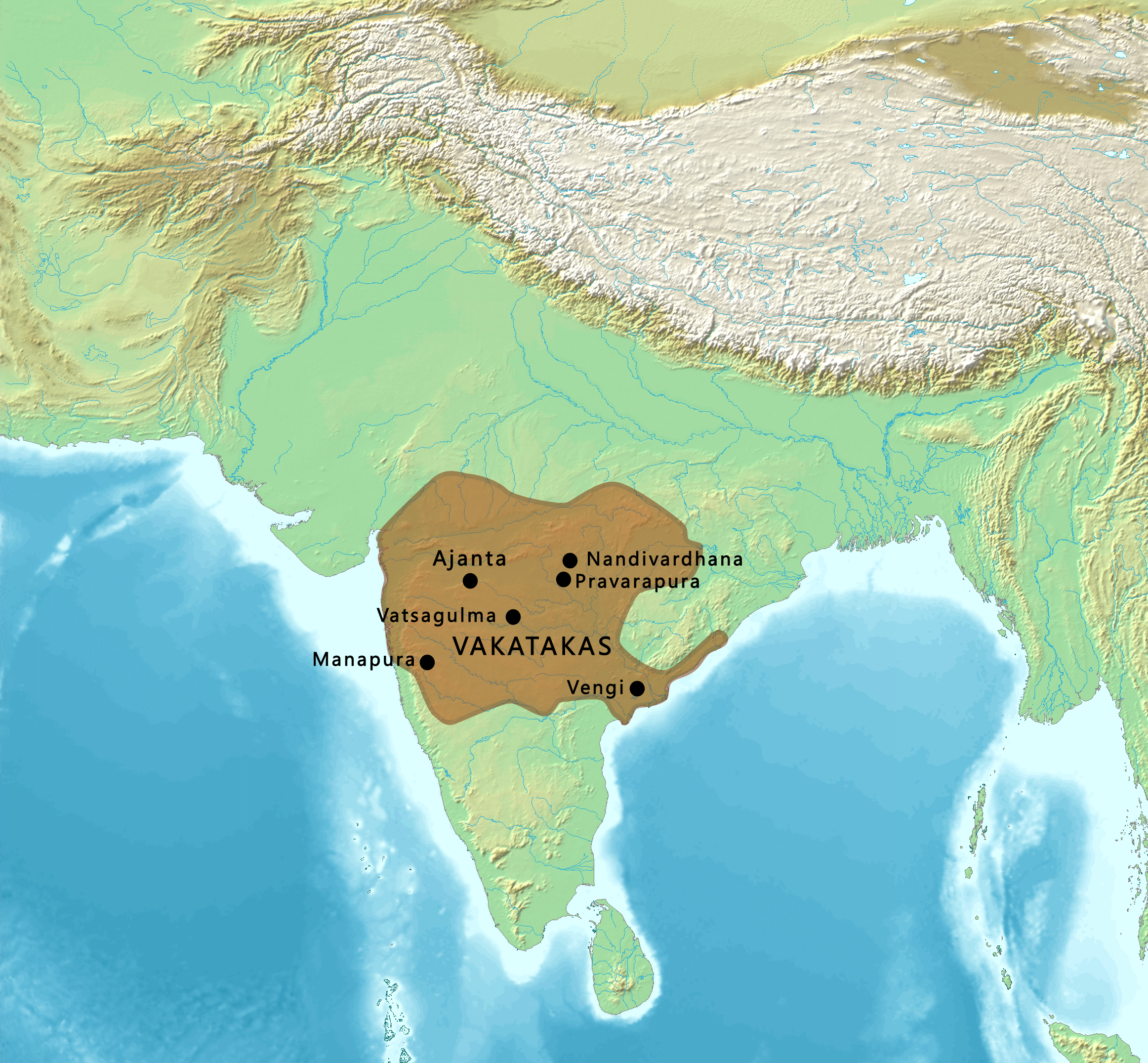
- Approximate extent of the Vakataka territories circa 350 CE.
- Capital: Vatsagulma (Now Washim)
- Common languages: Maharashtri Prakrit; Sanskrit
- Religion: Hinduism; Buddhism; Jainism
- Government: Monarchy
- Maharaja
  - 250–270: Vindhyashakti
  - 270–330: Pravarasena I
  - 480–510: Harishena
- Historical era: Classical India
  - Established: c. 250
  - Disestablished: c. 510
Preceded by
Western Satraps
Satavahana dynasty
Abhira dynasty
Succeeded by
Kalachuris of Mahishmati
Vishnukundina
Chalukya dynasty
Rajarsitulyakula
- Today part of: India

The Vakataka dynasty (IAST: Vākāṭaka) was an ancient Indian dynasty that originated from the Deccan in the mid-3rd century CE. Their state is believed to have extended from the southern edges of Malwa and Gujarat in the north to the Tungabhadra River in the south as well as from the Arabian Sea in the west to the edges of Chhattisgarh in the east. They were the most important successors of the Satavahanas in the Deccan and contemporaneous with the Guptas in northern India.

Little is known about Vindhyashakti (r. 250–270), the founder of the family. Territorial expansion began in the reign of his son Pravarasena I. It is generally believed that the Vakataka dynasty was divided into four branches after Pravarasena I. Two branches are known, and two are unknown. The known branches are the Pravarapura-Nandivardhana branch and the Vatsagulma branch. Gupta Emperor Chandragupta II married his daughter into the Vakataka royal family and, with their support, annexed Gujarat from the Saka Satraps in 4th century CE. The power vacuum left by the Vakatakas were filled by that of the Chalukyas of Badami in the Deccan region. The Vakatakas are noted for having been patrons of the arts, architecture and literature. They led public works and their monuments are a visible legacy. The rock-cut Buddhist viharas and chaityas of Ajanta Caves (a UNESCO World Heritage Site) were built under the patronage of Vakataka king, Harishena.

== Origins ==
Historian Ramaprasad Chanda proposed an early southern connection for the Vakatakas on the basis of an inscription from Amaravati in present-day Andhra Pradesh, dated to around the middle of the third century CE, which mentions a householder named Vakataka. He considered this evidence relevant to tracing the early presence of the Vakatakas in the Deccan. V. V. Mirashi subsequently developed the theory of a southern origin and associated the early Vakatakas with the Deccan. In addition to the Amaravati inscription, he drew attention to similarities between certain expressions used in the Vakataka and Pallava copper-plate grants, particularly those of the Vatsagulma branch. He also considered the use of titles such as Haritiputra and Dharmamaharaja by Vakataka rulers significant, as these titles are also found in records of several early, Deccan dynasties, including the Pallavas, Kadambas and Chalukyas of Badami. Mirashi further associated the Vakatakas with the Deccan through the presence of administrative and ministerial families connected with localities in the region. Taken together, these epigraphic and geographical observations led him to favour a Deccan origin for the dynasty.

Ajay Mitra Shastri placed the original homeland of the Vakatakas in the Vindhya region, particularly Bundelkhand and Baghelkhand. He based this interpretation mainly on Puranic traditions associating the dynasty with Vindhyashakti and describing it as Vindhyaka. The Puranas also associate Pravarasena I with Kanchanaka, identified by K. P. Jayaswal with Nachna in present-day Panna district, Madhya Pradesh.

The Vakatakas are associated with the Vishnuvriddha gotra, and the Ajanta inscription refers to Vindhyashakti as dvija. While some scholars viewed this as evidence of a Brahmin background, epigraphist K. V. Ramesh points out that according to the Srauta-Sutras, non-Brahmanical ruling families routinely adopted the Vedic-gotra of their domestic chaplain (purohita) to perform formal sacrifices, meaning the use of Vishnuvriddha does not prove Brahmin descent. Regarding the term dvija in the Ajanta inscription, Ramesh explains that it represents a broader social classification applying to the top strata of the varna system rather than serving as an exclusive designation for Brahmins. Furthermore, Ramesh highlights that the name Vakataka is a Sanskritisation of the local place-name Vakadu or kadu (meaning "forest"), and their capital Vatsagulma similarly translates the same root (gulma meaning thicket). Based on these linguistic and inscriptional factors, scholars argue that the Vakatakas were of local non-Brahmanical origin and underwent Sanskritization after establishing political dominance by performing sacrifices, forming matrimonial alliances with dynasties like the Nagas and Guptas, and adopting formal gotras for political legitimacy.

== Vindhyashakti ==
The founder of the dynasty was Vindhyashakti (r. 250–270), whose name is derived from the name of the goddess Vindhyavasini. Almost nothing is known about Vindhyashakti, the founder of the Vakatakas. According to the Puranas, Vindhyashakti was the ruler of Vidisha. In the Cave XVI inscription of Ajanta he was described as the banner of the Vakataka family and a Dvija. It is stated in this inscription that he added to his power by fighting great battles and he had a large cavalry. But no regal title is prefixed to his name in this inscription. The Puranas say that he ruled for 96 years. He was placed variously at south Deccan, Madhya Pradesh and Malwa. K.P. Jayaswal attributes Bagat, a village in the Jhansi district as the home of Vakatakas. But after refuting the theory regarding the northern home of the Vakatakas, V.V. Mirashi points out that the earliest mention of the name Vakataka occurs in an inscription found on a fragment of a pillar at Amravati which records the gift of a Grihapati (householder) Vakataka and his two wives. This Grihapati in all probability was the progenitor of Vidhyashakti.

== Pravarasena I ==
The next ruler was Pravarasena I (270–330), who maintained the realm as a great power, he was the first Vakataka ruler, who called himself a Samrat (universal ruler) and conducted wars with the Naga kings. He has become an emperor in his own right, perhaps the only emperor in the dynasty, with his kingdom embracing a good portion of North India and whole of Deccan. He carried his arms to the Narmada in the north and annexed the kingdom of Purika which was being ruled by a king named Sisuka. In any case, he certainly ruled from Bundelkhand in the north (though Dr Mirashi does not accept that he has crossed the Narmada) to the present Andhra Pradesh in the south. The puranas assign him a reign of 60 years.

As per V.V. Mirashi, it is unlikely that he made any conquest in Northern Maharashtra, Gujarat or Konkan. But, he may have conquered parts of North Kuntala comprising Kolhapur, Satara and Solapur districts of Maharashtra. In the east, he may have carried his arms to Dakshina Kosala, Kalinga and Andhra. He was a follower of Vedic religion and performed several Yajnas (sacrifices) which include Agnishtoma, Aptoryama, Ukthya, Shodasin, Atiratra, Vajapeya, Brihaspatisava, Sadyaskra and four Asvamedhas. He heavily donated to the Brahmins during the Vajapeya sacrifice as per the Puranas. He also took up the title of Dharmamaharaja in addition to Samrat. He called himself as Haritiputra. His prime minister Deva was a very pious and learned Brahmin. The Puranas say that Pravarasena I had four sons. He married his son Gautamiputra to a daughter of King Bhavanaga of the powerful Bharashiva family, which might have proved to be helpful. However, Gautamiputra predeceased him and he was succeeded by his grandson Rudrasena I, the son of Gautamiputra. His second son, Sarvasena set up his capital at Vatsagulma (the present day Washim). Nothing is known about the dynasties set up by the other two sons.

== Branches of Vakataka dynasty ==
It is generally believed that the Vakataka ruling family was divided into four branches after Pravarasena I. Two branches are known and two are unknown. The known branches are the Pravarpura-Nandivardhana branch and the Vatsagulma branch.

=== Pravarapura-Nandivardhana branch ===
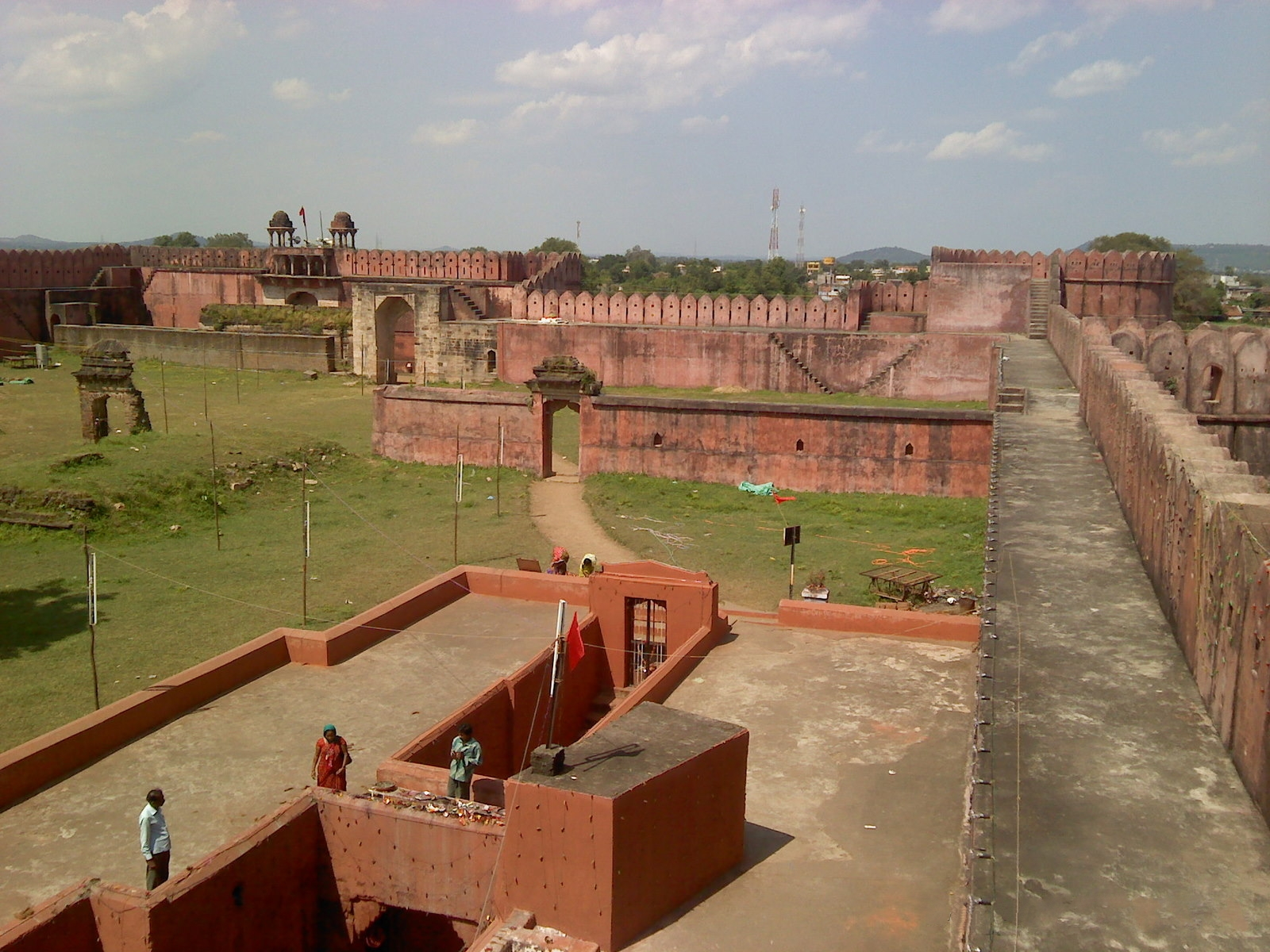
Ruins of Nandivardhana fort

The Pravarapura-Nandivardhana branch ruled from various sites like Pravarapura (Paunar) in Wardha district and Mansar and Nandivardhan (Nagardhan) in Nagpur district. This branch maintained matrimonial relations with the Imperial Guptas.

==== Rudrasena I ====
Not much is known about Rudrasena I, the son of Gautamiputra, who ruled from Nandivardhana, near Ramtek hill, about 30 km from Nagpur. There is a mention of Rudradeva in the Allahabad pillar inscription, bundled along with the other rulers of Aryavarta. A number of scholars, like A.S. Altekar do not agree that Rudradeva is Rudrasena I, since if Rudrasena I had been exterminated by Samudragupta, it is extremely unlikely that his son Prithivishena I would accept a Gupta princess (Prabhavatigupta) as his daughter-in-law. Secondly, no inscription of Rudrasena I has been found north of the Narmada. The only stone inscription of Rudrasena I's reign discovered so far was found at Deotek in the present-day Chandrapur district, so he can not be equated with Rudradeva of the Allahabad pillar inscription, who belonged to the Aryavarta.

==== Rudrasena II, Divakarasena and Pravarasena II ====
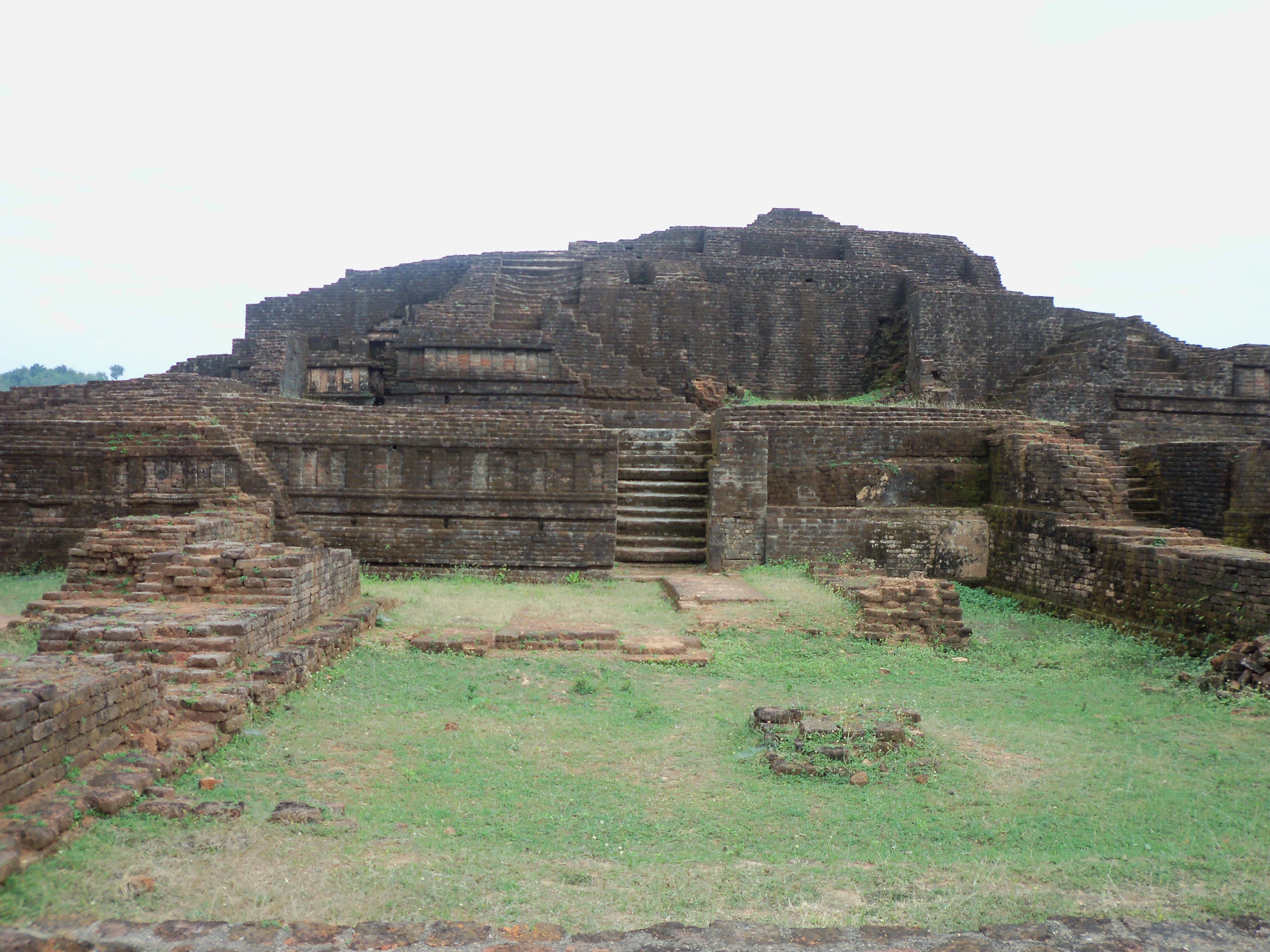
Remains of the Pravareshvara Shiva temple built by Pravarasena II at Mansar

Rudrasena II (380–385) is said to have married Prabhavatigupta, the daughter of the Gupta King Chandragupta II (375–413/15). This is now confirmed by the Kevala-Narasimha inscriptions of Ramtek, where it is announced that (Cā)mundā, a daughter of Queen Prabhavatigupta was given in marriage to the Prince Ghatotkachagupta (who was likely a son of Chandragupta II).

Rudrasena II died fortuitously after a very short reign in 385 CE, following which Prabhavatigupta (385–405) ruled as a regent on behalf of her two sons, Divakarasena and Damodarasena (Pravarasena II) for 20 years. During this period the Vakataka realm was practically a part of the Gupta Empire. Many historians refer to this period as the Vakataka-Gupta age. While this has been widely accepted more than 30 years ago, this line of argument has no proper evidence. Prabhavati Gupta's inscription mentions about one "Deva Gupta" who is her father and the historians equated him with Chandra Gupta II. However, there is no other source to prove that Deva Gupta is really Chandra Gupta II. Pravarasena II composed the Setubandha in Maharashtri Prakrit. A few verses of the Gaha Sattasai are also attributed to him. He shifted the capital from Nandivardhana to Pravarapura, a new city of founded by him. He built a temple dedicated to Rama in his new capital.

The highest number of so far discovered copperplate inscriptions of the Vakataka dynasty (in all 17) pertain to Pravarasena II. He is perhaps the most recorded ruler of ancient India after Ashoka the Great. See: Shreenand L. Bapat, A Second Jamb (Khandvi) Copperplate Grant of Vakataka Ruler Pravarasena II (Shravana Shuddha 13, Regnal Year 21), Annals of the Bhandarkar Oriental Research Institute, Vol. 91, pp. 1–31

==== Narendrasena and Prithivishena II ====
Pravarasena II was succeeded by Narendrasena (440–460), under whom the Vakataka influence spread to some central Indian states. Prithivishena II, the last known king of the line, succeeded his father Narendrasena in c. 460. He was Defeated by Vishnukundina King Madhava Varma II, After his death in 480, his kingdom was probably annexed by Harishena of the Vatsagulma branch.

=== Vatsagulma branch ===
Ajanta Caves

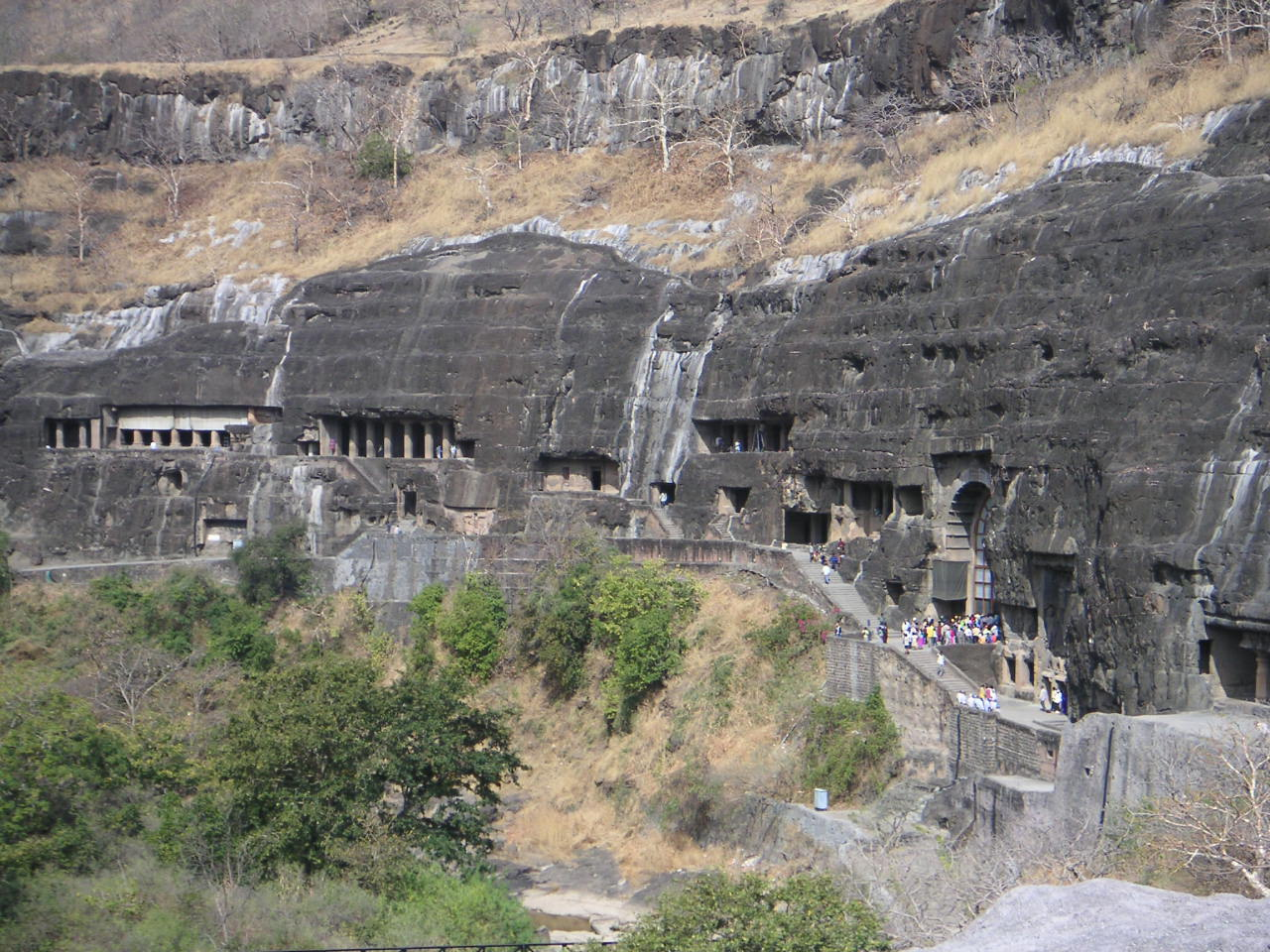
The Ajanta Caves, built under the patronage of the Vatsagulma branch of the Vakataka rulers.

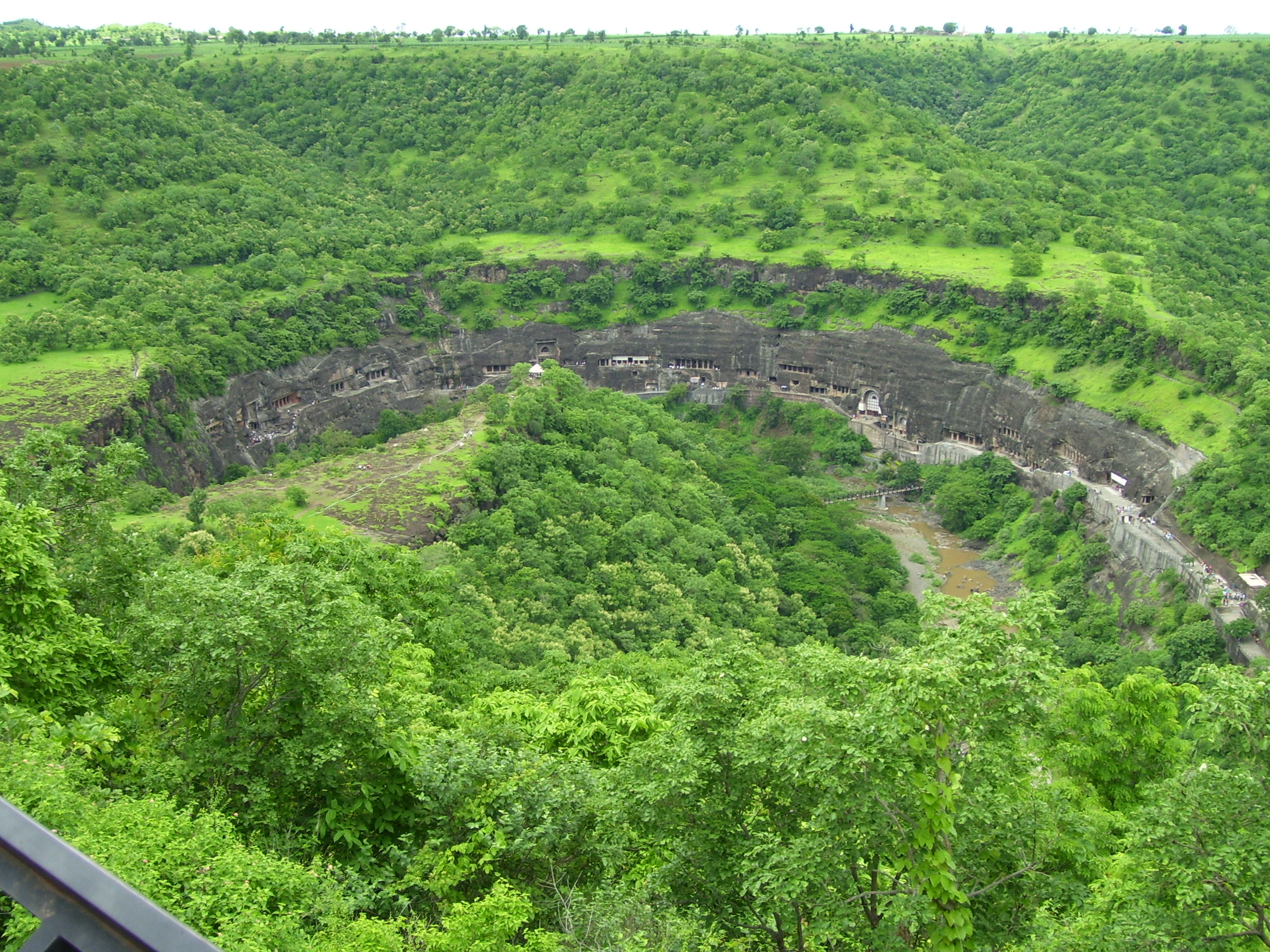
Bird's Eye View of Ajanta Caves.

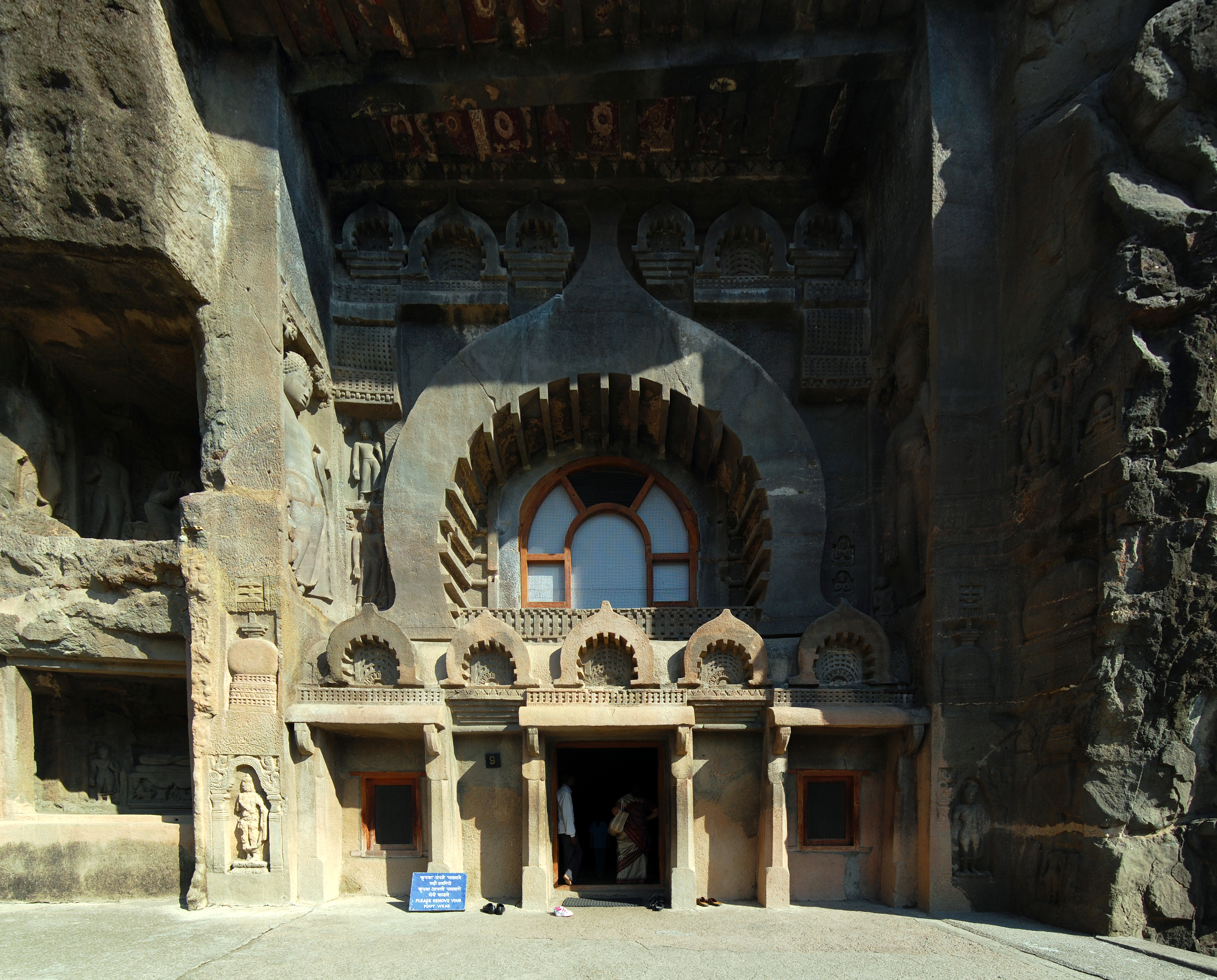
Entrance of cave no. 9.

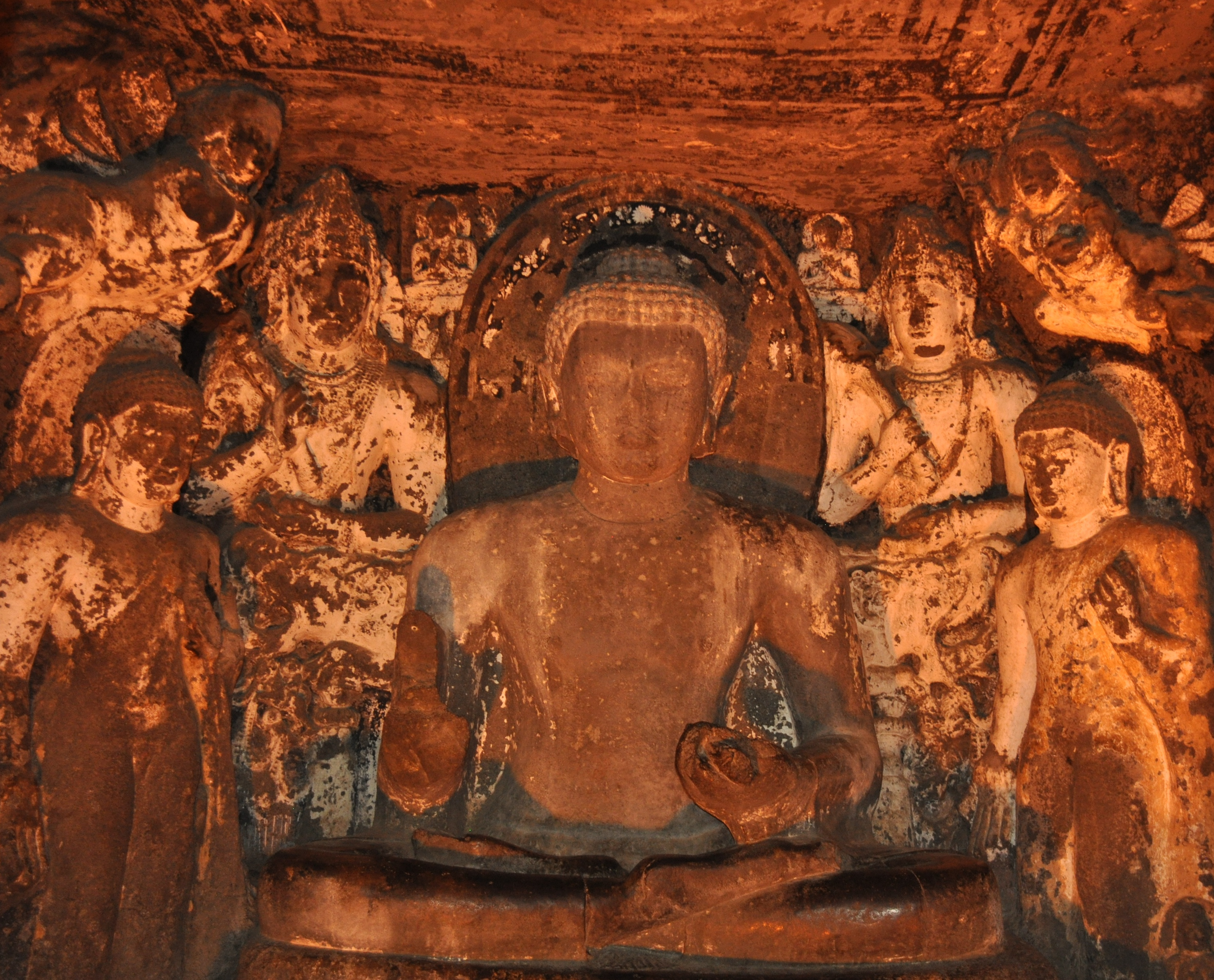
Lord Buddha statue at Ajanta.

The Vatsagulma branch was founded by Sarvasena, the second son of Pravarasena I after his death. King Sarvasena made Vatsagulma, the present day Washim in Washim district of Maharashtra his capital. The territory ruled by this branch was between the Sahydri Range and the Godavari River. They patronized some of the Buddhist caves at Ajanta.

==== Sarvasena ====
Sarvasena (c. 330–355) took the title of Dharmamaharaja. He is also known as the author of Harivijaya in Prakrit which is based on the story of bringing the parijata tree from heaven by Krishna. This work, praised by later writers is lost. He is also known as the author of many verses of the Prakrit Gaha Sattasai. One of his minister's name was Ravi. He was succeeded by his son Vindhyasena.

==== Vindhyasena ====
Vindhysena (c. 355–400) was also known as Vindhyashakti II. He is known from the well-known Washim plates which recorded the grant of a village situated in the northern marga (sub-division) of Nandikata (presently Nanded) in his 37th regnal year. The genealogical portion of the grant is written in Sanskrit and the formal portion in Prakrit. This is the first known land grant by any Vakataka ruler. He also took the title of Dharmamaharaja. Vindhyasena defeated the ruler of Kuntala, his southern neighbour. One of his minister's name was Pravara. He was succeeded by his son Pravarasena II.

==== Pravarasena II ====
Pravarasena II (c. 400–415) was the next ruler of whom very little is known except from the Cave XVI inscription of Ajanta, which says that he became exalted by his excellent, powerful and liberal rule. He died after a very short rule and succeeded by his minor son, who was only 8 years old when his father died. Name of this ruler is lost from the Cave XVI inscription.

==== Devasena ====
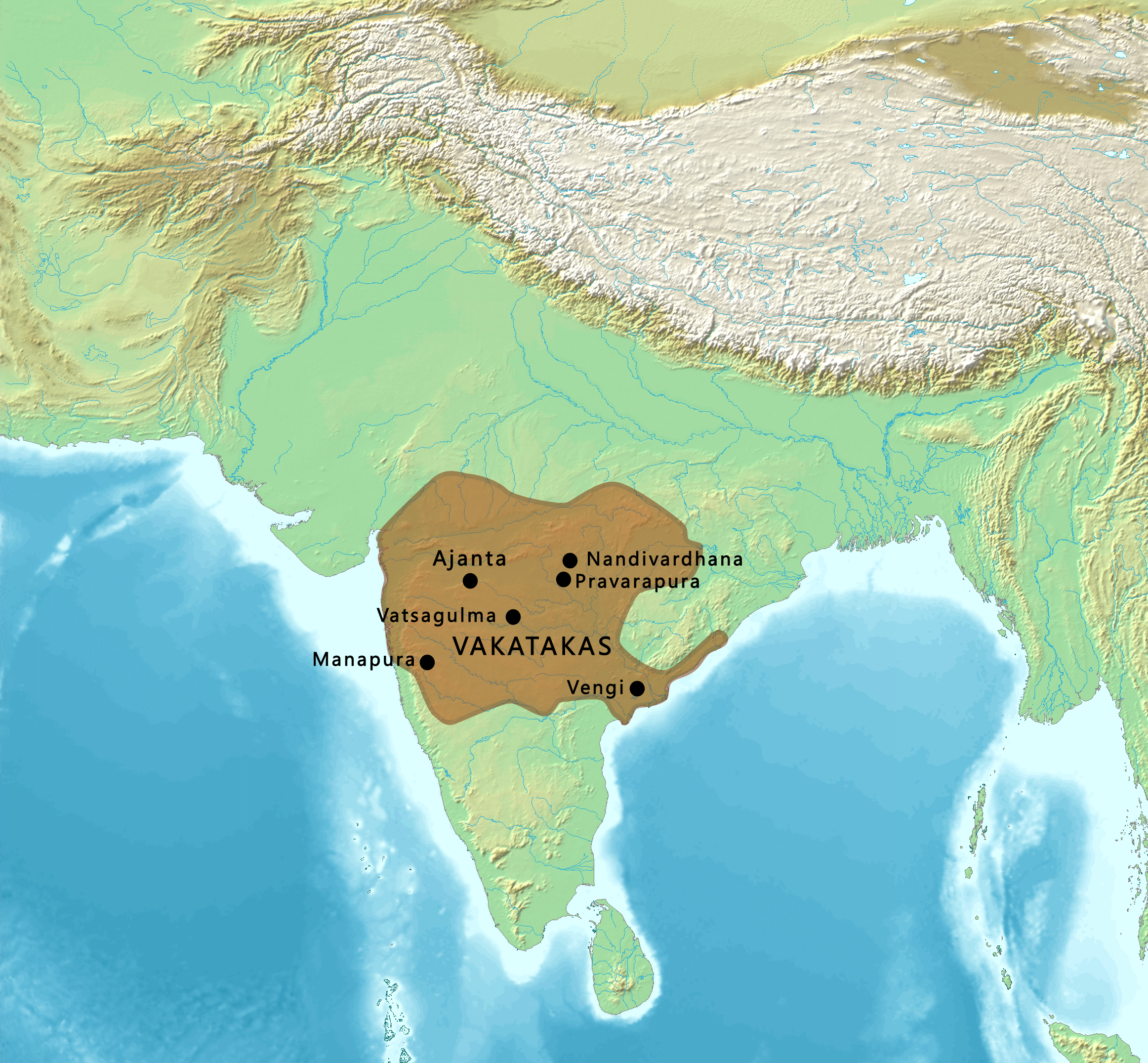
Approximate extent of Vakataka territory and location of neighbouring polities c. 480 CE, at the end of Vakataka rule, during the reign of king Harishena, when most of the caves of Ajanta (red dot) were built.

This unknown ruler was succeeded by his son Devasena (c. 450–475). His administration was actually run by his minister Hastibhoja. During his reign, one of his servant Svaminadeva excavated a tank named Sudarshana near Washim in c. 458–459.

==== Harishena ====
Harishena (c. 475–500) succeeded his father Devasena. He was a great patron of Buddhist architecture, art and culture. The World Heritage monument Ajanta Caves is surviving example of his works. The rock cut architectural cell-XVI inscription of Ajanta states that he conquered Avanti (Malwa) in the north, Kosala (Chhattisgarh), Kalinga and Andhra in the east, Lata (Central and Southern Gujarat) and Trikuta (Nasik district) in the west and Kuntala (Southern Maharashtra) in the south. Varahadeva, a minister of Harishena and the son of Hastibhoja, excavated the rock-cut vihara of Cave XVI of Ajanta. Three of the Buddhist caves at Ajanta, two viharas – caves XVI and XVII and a chaitya – cave XIX were excavated and decorated with painting and sculptures during the reign of Harishena. According to an art historian, Walter M. Spink, all the rock-cut monuments of Ajanta excluding caves nos. 9,10,12,13 and 15A (Ref: Page No. 4, Ajanta-A Brief History and Guide – Walter M. Spink) were built during Harishena's reign.

Harishena was succeeded by two rulers whose names are not known. The end of the dynasty is unknown. They were probably defeated by the Kalachuri of Mahismati.

== Family tree ==
Vakataka dynasty

Vindhyashakti^{(1)} r. c. 250–275
Pravarasena I^{(2)} r. c. 275–335
Nandivardhana- Pravapura; Branch	Vatsagulma; Branch
Gautamiputra	Sarvasena I^{(1)} r. c. 335–355
Rudrasena I^{(1)} r. c. 335–360	Vindhyasena^{(2)} r. c. 355–400
Prithivishena I^{(2)} r. c. 360–385	Pravarasena II^{(3)} r. c. 400–415
Gupta dynasty
Rudrasena II^{(3)} r. c. 385–390	Prabhavatigupta; Regent r. c. 390–410	Sarvasena II^{(4)} r. c. 415–455
Divakarasena^{(4)} r. c. 390–410	Damodarasena^{(5)} r. c. 410–420	Pravarasena II^{(6)} r. c. 420–455	Devasena^{(5)} r. c. 455–480
Narendrasena^{(7)} r. c. 455–480	Harishena^{(6)} r. c. 480–510
Prithivishena II^{(8)} r. c. 480–500

== Alternative source for the dynasty's decline ==
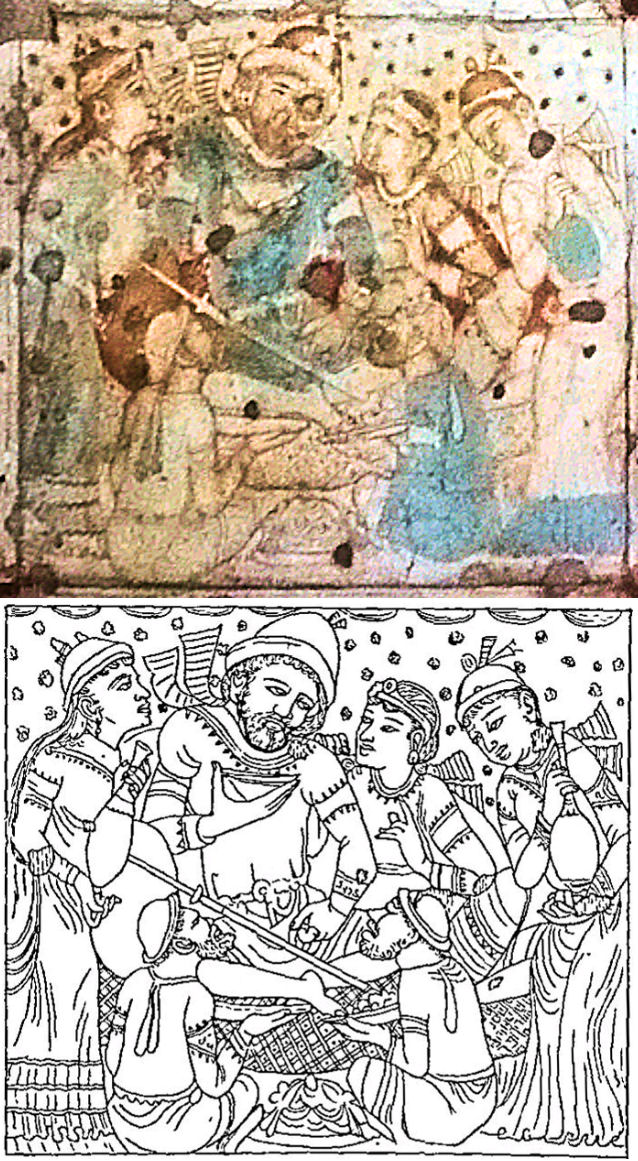
Foreign dignitary in Persian dress drinking wine, on ceiling of Cave 1, at Ajanta Caves, either depicting the Sasanian embassy to Pulakesin II (610–642 CE), or simply a genre scene during the Vakataka Dynasty if the 460–480 CE dating is retained (photograph and drawing).

According to the eighth ucchvāsaḥ of the Dashakumaracharita of Dandin, which was written probably around 125 years after the fall of the Vakataka dynasty, Harishena's son, though intelligent and accomplished in all arts, neglected the study of the Dandaniti (Political Science) and gave himself up to the enjoyment of pleasures and indulged in all sorts of vices. His subjects also followed him and led a vicious and dissolute life. Finding this a suitable opportunity, the ruler of the neighbouring Ashmaka sent his minister's son to the court of the Vakatakas. The latter ingratiated himself with the king and egged him on in his dissolute life. He also decimated his forces by various means. Ultimately, when the country was thoroughly disorganised, the ruler of Ashmaka instigated the Kadamba ruler of Vanavasi (in the North Kanara district) to invade the Vakataka territory. The king called all his feudatories and decided to fight his enemy on the bank of the Varada (Wardha). While fighting with the forces of the enemy, he was treacherously attacked in the rear by some of his own feudatories and killed. The Vakataka dynasty ended with his death. This fact is also corroborated by a set of three copper plates of the Davanagere record of the Kadamba king Ravivarma dated 519 CE which state as per historian D. C. Sircar that the king's suzerainty extended over the whole of South India as far as the Narmada river in the north to the Kaveri river near Talakad (the then Western Ganga capital) in the south and that the people of these lands sought his protection. This implies that the Kadambas conquered the entire Vakataka kingdom and annexed it to their territory during Ravivarma's rule (485–519 CE) probably sometime after 500 CE.

== Coinage ==
Although the Vakatakas replaced the Satavahanas, it does not seem that they continued their coin-minting tradition. As of today, no Vakataka coins have ever been identified or found.

== See also ==
- Maharashtra
- Deccan
