= Ajay Mitra Shastri =

Indian academic and historian (1934–2002)

- Born: Mahendra Kumar; 5 March 1934; Guna, Central India Agency, British India (now Madhya Pradesh, India)
- Died: 11 January 2002 (aged 67)
- Occupations: academic, historian, numismatist
- Years active: 1957–2002

Ajay Mitra Shastri (5 March 1934 – 11 January 2002) was an Indian academic, historian and numismatist associated with the Nagpur University.

== Early life and education ==
A. M. Shastri was born on 5 March 1934 at Guna in Central India Agency, British India (now Madhya Pradesh, India). Originally named Mahendra Kumar, he spent four years at gurukuls (residential schools) at Rajor (Faizabad) and Ayodhya, where he chose the name "Ajay Mitra" from a list of names suggested by his acharya (teacher).

He subsequently joined a Sanskrit school at Baran in present-day Rajasthan, where he passed the Madhyama examination. He also passed the Visharad and Sahitya Ratna exams in Hindi language. Subsequently, he passed the Shastri examination from the Government Sanskrit College, Varanasi, and adopted "Shastri" as his last name. During this period, he also passed Matriculation and Intermediate examinations. In 1953, he obtained the Shastri degree (equivalent to Bachelor of Arts) with Sociology, History and Political Science specializations from the Kashi Vidyapith. In 1957, he obtained a Master of Arts degree in Ancient Indian History and Culture from the Banaras Hindu University.

== Career ==
In 1957, Shastri became a lecturer at the Department of Ancient History and Culture at the Nagpur University. There, he completed PhD on Brhat-samhita of Varahamihira in 1962. He held various posts at the Nagpur University until his retirement, including Lecturer (1957–1965), Reader (1965–1977) and Professor (1977–1994).

In 1980, Shastri suffered a retinal detachment, and underwent multiple operations. Dr. Ishwarchandra, an eye specialist of Nagpur, and Dr. S. S. Badrinath, an eye surgeon of Chennai, advised him to stop reading and writing completely in order to save his vision. However, Shastri continued to engage in these activities, and wrote several books and articles, besides editing multiple journals. He died on 11 January 2002.

== Works ==
- Ajay Mitra Shastri; Varāhamihira (1996). Ancient Indian Heritage, Varahamihira's India: Economy, astrology, fine arts, and literature. Aryan Books International. ISBN 978-81-7305-082-4.
- Ajay Mitra Shastri (1991). Varāhamihira and his times. Kusumanjali Prakashan.
- Ajay Mitra Shastri (1969). India as seen in the Bṛhatsaṁhitā of Varāhamihira. Motilal Banarsidass. ISBN 9780896842212.
- Ajay Mitra Shastri (1975). India, as seen in the Kuṭṭanī-Mata of Dāmodaragupta. Motilal Banarasidass. ISBN 9780842609548.
- Ajay Mitra Shastri (2002). Ancient North-East India: Prāgjyotisha : a Pan-India perspective, up to seventh century AD. Aryan Books International. ISBN 978-81-7305-219-4.
- Ajay Mitra Shastri (1965). An Outline of Early Buddhism: A Historical Survey of Buddhology, Buddhist Schools & Sanghas Mainly Based on the Study of Pre-Gupta Inscriptions. Indological Book House.
- Ajay Mitra Shastri (1976). Coins and Early Indian Economy. Numismatic Society of India.
- Ajay Mitra Shastri (1979). Kauśāmbī Hoard of Magha Coins: A Study of the Magha Coinage Based on the Kauśāmbī Hoard. Nagpur University.
- Ajay Mitra Shastri (1997). Vākāṭakas: Sources and History. Aryan Books International. ISBN 978-81-7305-123-4.
- Ajay Mitra Shastri (1992). The Age of the Vākāṭakas. Harman Publishing House. ISBN 978-81-85151-51-9.
- Ajay Mitra Shastri (1999). The Age of the Sātavāhanas. Aryan Books International. ISBN 978-81-7305-158-6.
- Ajay Mitra Shastri (1998). The Sātavāhanas and the Western Kshatrapas: a historical framework. Dattsons. ISBN 978-81-7192-031-0.
- Ajay Mitra Shastri (2009). Tripurī. Madhyapradeśa Hindī Grantha Akadamī.
- Ajaya Mitra Shastri (1995). Inscriptions of the Śarabhapurīyas, Pāṇḍuvaṁśins, and Somavaṁśins (Part I and II). Motilal Banarsidass. ISBN 9788120806351.
