= Kuntala country =

Ancient region in Karnataka

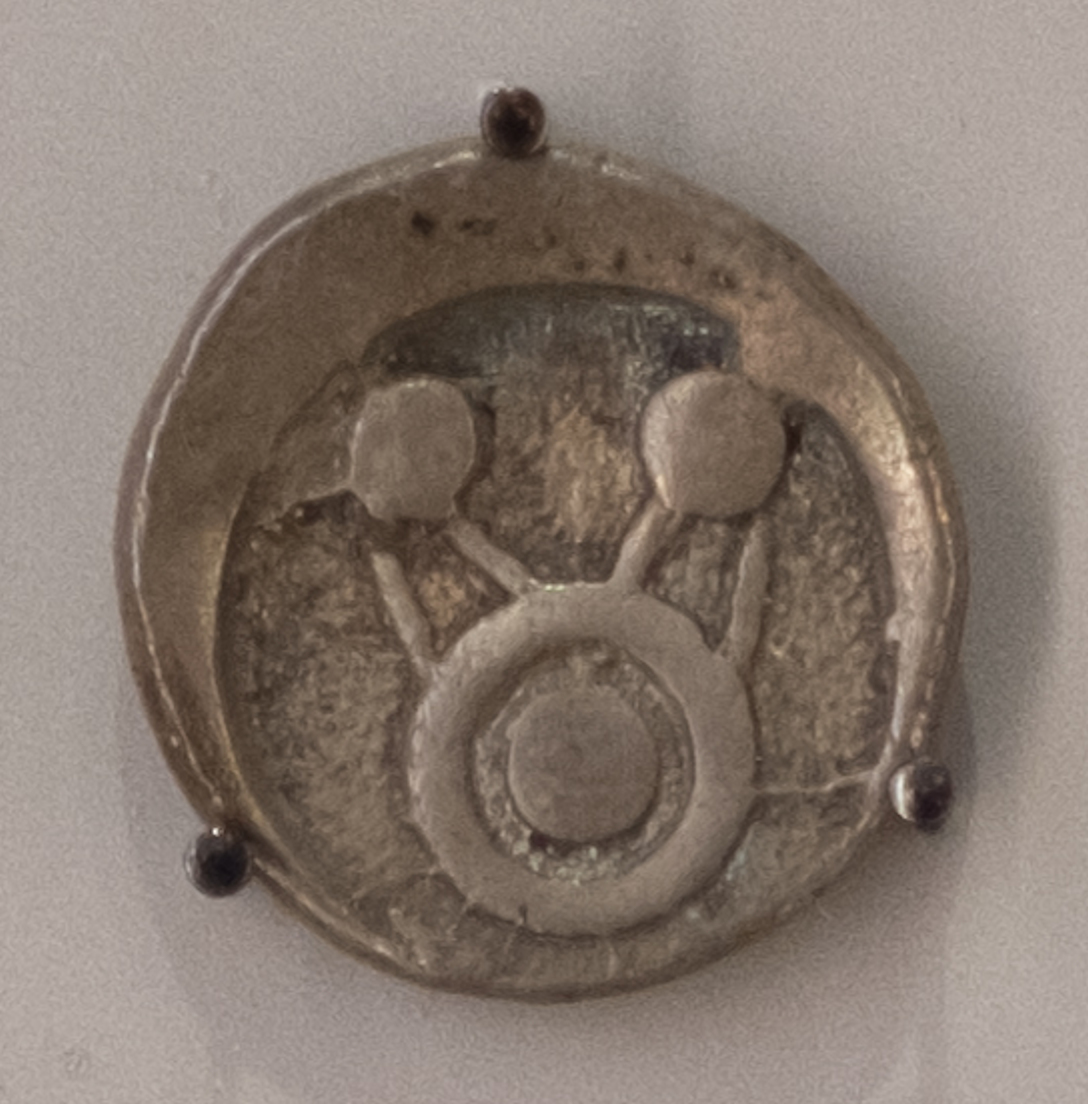
Kuntala coinage 400–300 BCE

The Kuntala country is an ancient Indian political region which included the north-western parts of Mysore and the southern parts of the Bombay Presidency. Kuntala coins are available since estimated 600–450 BCE. Kuntala formed one of the divisions of Southern India as late as 10th-12th centuries A.D. (other regions were: Chola, Chera, Pandya and Andhra). Each developed its own culture and administration. The Talagunda inscriptions mention Balligavi and nearby regions as parts of Kuntala. Inscriptions in Kubaturu near Anavatti mention Kubaturu as the Kuntalanagara. Kuntala is revered as one of the three great countries of Chalukya period in inscriptions.

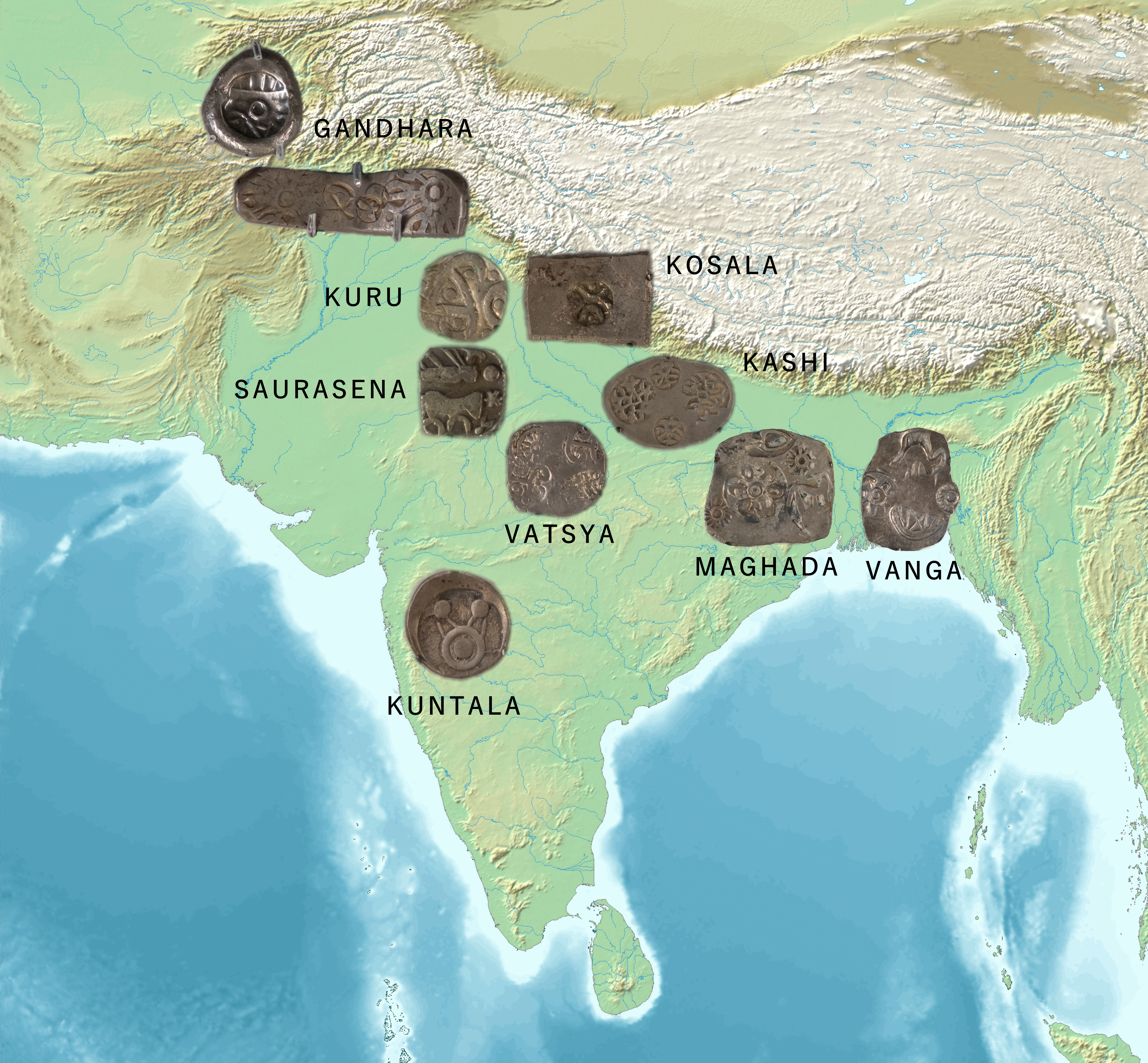
Map showing the ancient Indian coinage from Kuntala region, 3rd-4th century BC.

== Scriptural references ==
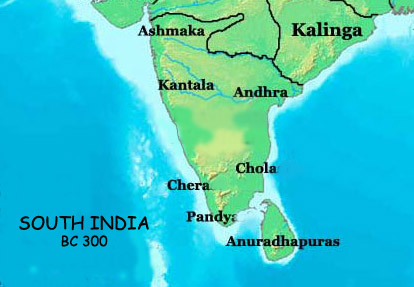
South India in 300 BCE, Kuntala

Kannada Mahabharata mentions the visit of Krishna and Arjuna to Kuntala during Ashwamedha when Chandrahasa was the king of Kuntala who sends two of his children along with Arjuna for the further campaigns.

Copperplates issued by the Yadavas of Devagiri mention the Nāgas as its oldest known rulers. Rashtrakutas, Satavahanas, Vakatakas, Chalukyas, Chutus, Vishnukundina have ruled Kuntala, as suggested by stone inscriptions and copperplates. Kuntala is identified with Raṭṭapāḍi which is translated as settlements of the Raṭṭas. Copperplates of Pulakeshin II speak of him as the king of three Mahārāṣṭrakas, Kuntala being one of the Maharashtrakas (other two being Vidarbha, and Konkan region of 99,000 villages.

Kalidasa mentions as Kuntala and the lord of Kuntala (as Kuntalānāmadhīśa, Kuntalādhipati, Kuntalādhīśa) in his works.

== In popular culture ==
Devsena, the heroine in the director S. S. Rajamouli's film Bahubali 2: The Conclusion was the princess of Kuntala Kingdom.
