= Ancient Indian architecture =

Architecture of India from the Bronze Age to the 9th century CE

Ancient Indian architecture

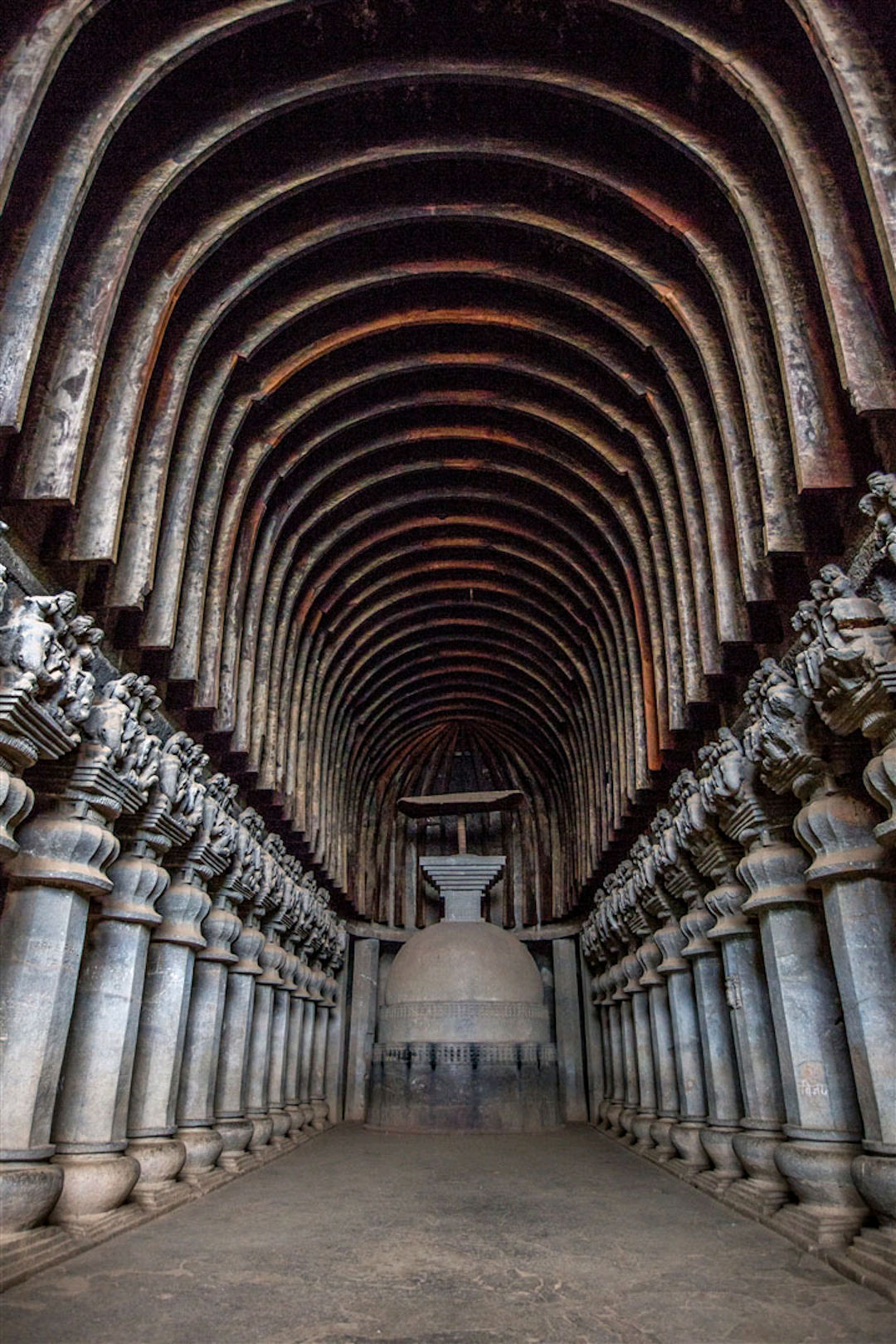
The Great Chaitya in the Buddhist Karla Caves, Maharashtra, India, c. 120 CE

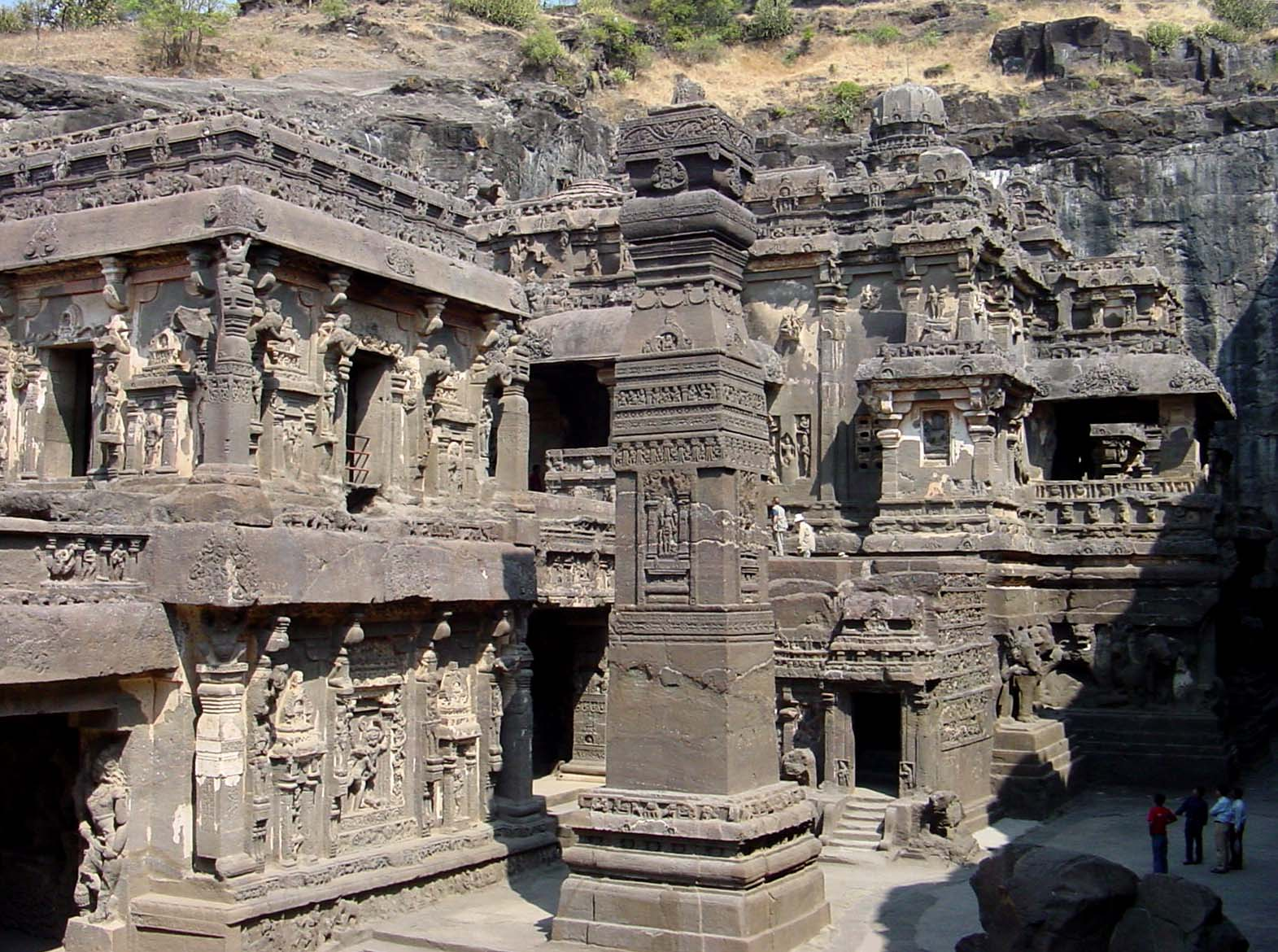
Rock-cut Hindu temple

Ancient Indian architecture ranges from the Indian Bronze Age to around 800 CE. By this endpoint, Buddhism in India had greatly declined, and Hinduism was predominant, and religious and secular building styles had taken on forms, with great regional variation, which they largely retain even after some forceful changes brought about by the arrival of first Islam, and then Europeans.

Much early Indian architecture was in wood, which has almost always decayed or burnt, or brick, which has often been taken away for re-use. The large amount of Indian rock-cut architecture, essentially beginning around 250 BCE, is therefore especially important, as much of it clearly adapts forms from contemporary constructed buildings of which no examples remain. There are also a number of important sites where the floor-plan has survived to be excavated, but the upper parts of structures have vanished.

In the Bronze Age, the first cities emerged in the Indus Valley Civilization. The urbanization in the Gangetic plains began as early as 1200 BC with the emergence of fortified cities and appearance of Northern Black Polished Ware. (Note: Most sites of the Painted Grey Ware culture in the Ghaggar-Hakra and Upper Ganges Plain were small farming villages. However, "several dozen" PGW sites eventually emerged as relatively large settlements that can be characterized as towns, the largest of which were fortified by ditches or moats and embankments made of piled earth with wooden palisades, albeit smaller and simpler than the elaborately fortified large cities which grew after 600 BCE in the more fully urban Northern Black Polished Ware culture.) The Mahajanapada period was characterized by Indian coins and use of stone in the Indian architecture. The Mauryan period is considered as the beginning of the classical period of Indian architecture. Nagara and Dravidian architectural styles developed in the early medieval period with the rise of Hindu revivalism and predominant role of Hindu temple architecture in the Indian Subcontinent.

== Prehistoric ==
=== Baghor Paleolithic shrine ===
A strongly probable shrine from Upper Paleolithic period dated (9000–8000 BCE) dedicated to worshipping of Goddess (Shakti) made of stone has been discovered at Baghor in the Sidhi district in the Indian state of Madhya Pradesh.

== Bronze Age period ==
Planning of Indus Valley civilization cities

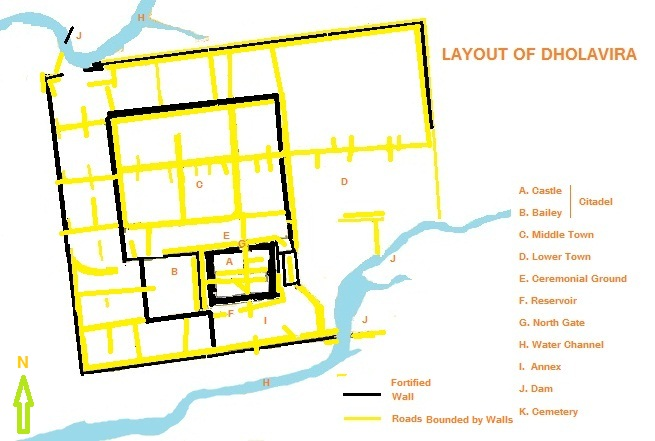
Layout of Dholavira

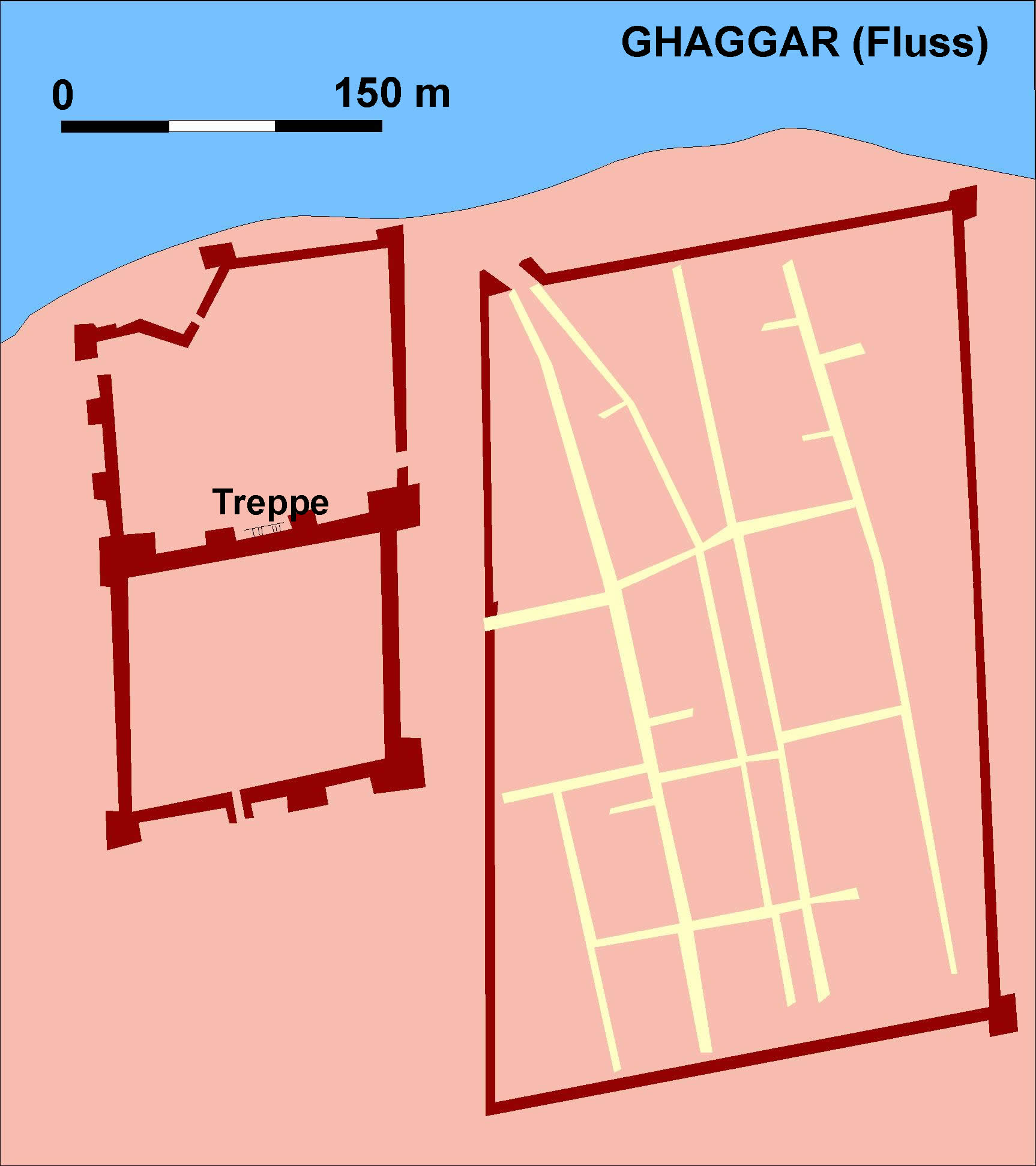
Fortification of Kalibangan with square bastions and fort walls surrounding the city

=== Period (5th–2nd Millennium BCE) ===
==== Early Harappan phase ====
Although the urban phase of Harappa has been dated back to 2600 BCE, excavation at Kalibangan from the early or proto-Harappan period already shows an urban development with fortification, grid layout of the city and drain system. The settlement consisted of a fortified city mostly made of mud-brick architecture but characterized by an appearance of fired bricks around 3000 BCE which was used to line the drains of the city. Planned settlements from an early Harappan era with structures parallel to the streets which run perpendicular to each other with public drainage system has been uncovered at the site of Rakhigarhi, one of the biggest urbanized areas of the Indus Valley Civilization dating back to 4000–3200 BCE. Even earlier phase dated 4400–4200 BCE has marked the appearance of wedge-shaped mud bricks with rectangular houses.

==== English Bond and building material ====
While in contemporary Bronze Age cultures outside India sun-dried mud bricks were the dominant building material, the Indus Valley Civilization preferred to use fired "terracotta" brick instead. A prominent feature of Harappan architecture was also the first use anywhere in the world of English bond in building with bricks. This type of bonding utilized alternate headers and stretchers which is a stronger method of construction. Clay was usually used as cementing material but where better strength was needed, such as for the drains, lime and gypsum mortar was preferred instead. In architecture such as the Great Bath, bitumen was used for waterproofing. The bricks were produced in a standardized ratio of 4:2:1, found throughout the Indus Valley civilization.

==== Larger buildings ====
The excavation at Banawali in present-day Haryana has also yielded an Apsidal plan which has been interpreted as a temple.

At Dholavira, possible funerary architecture was found surrounding a dried up lake and consists of tumuli, sometimes resembling hemispherical domes, constructed using mud bricks or stone slabs.

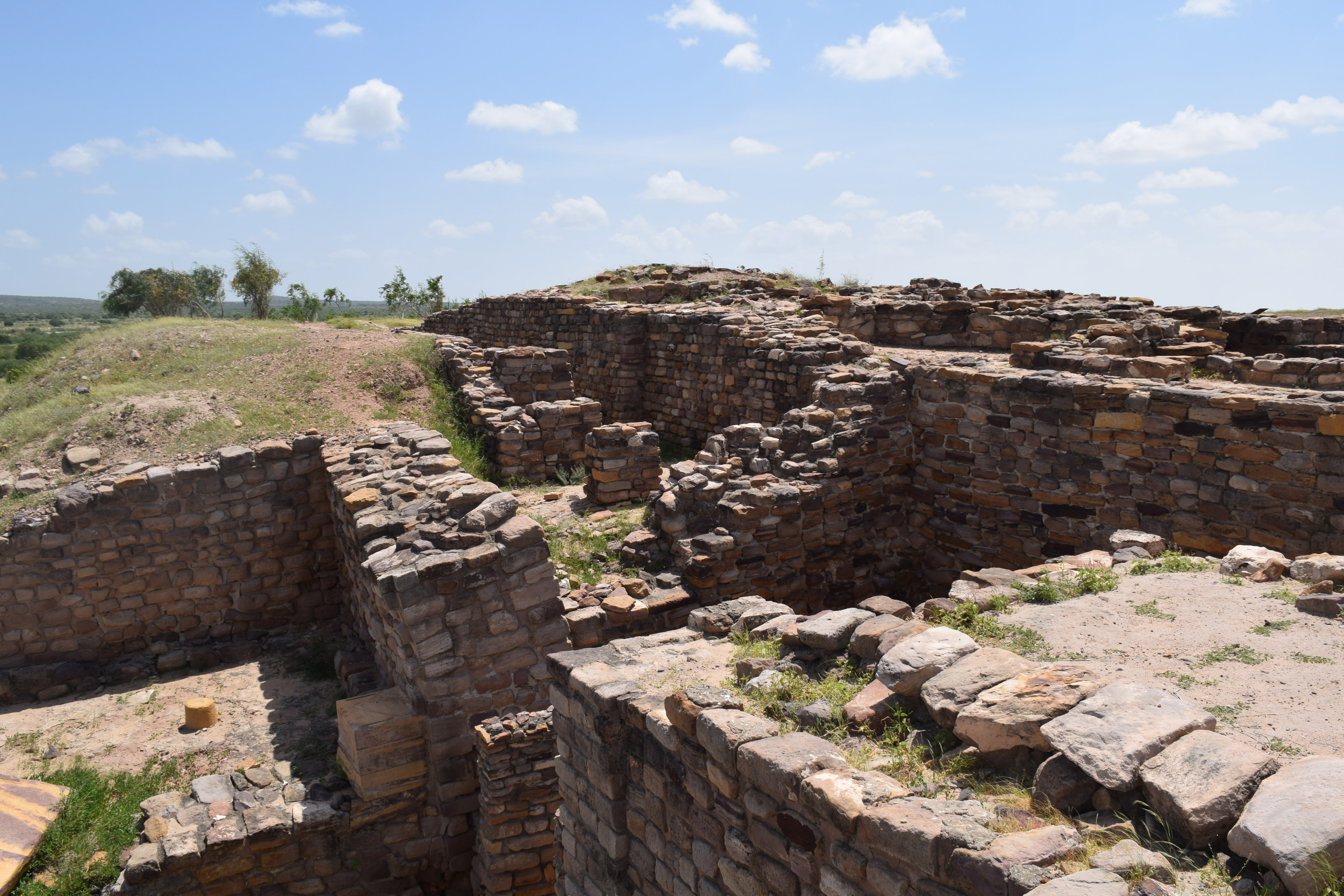
Dholavira ruins

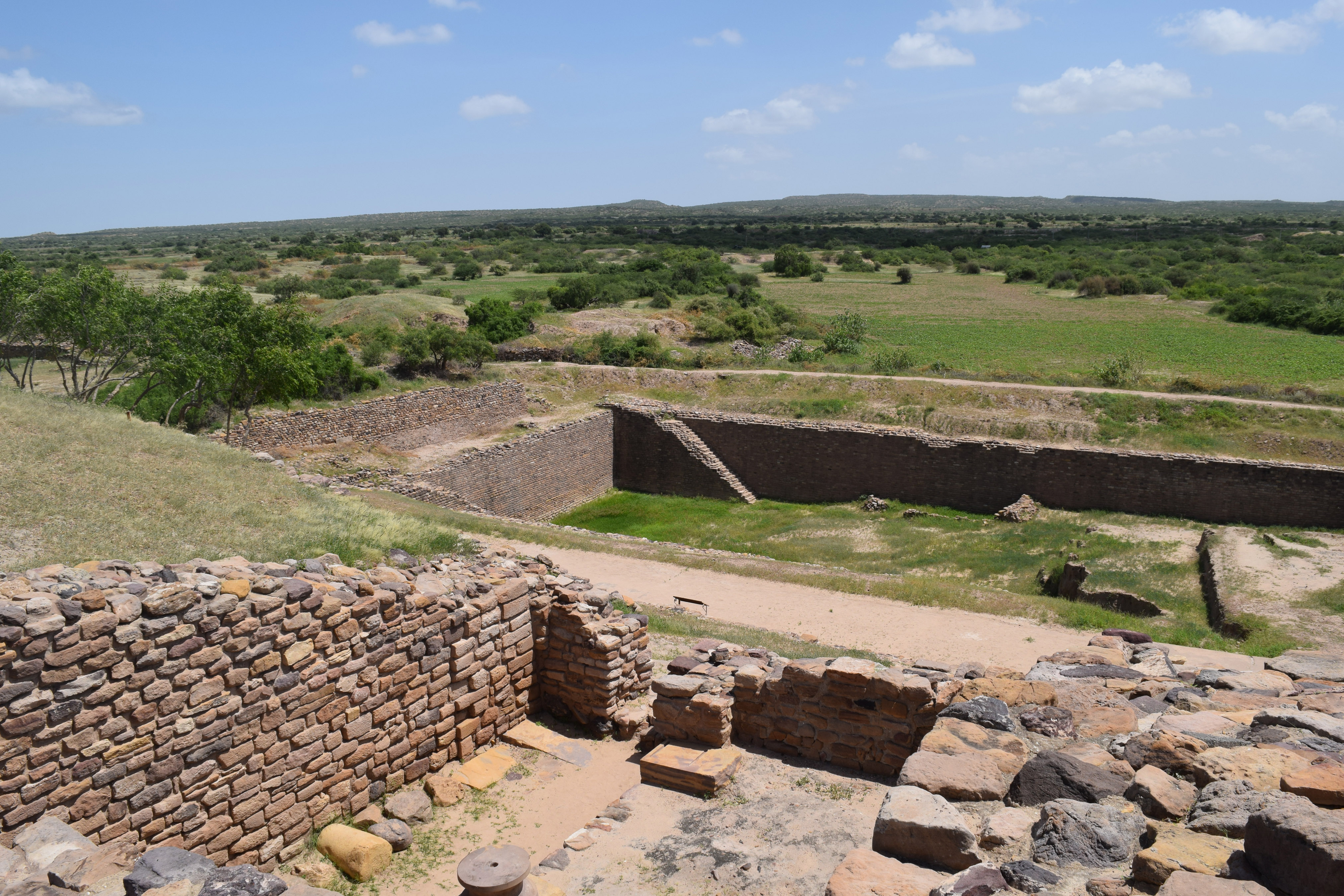
Stepped reservoir

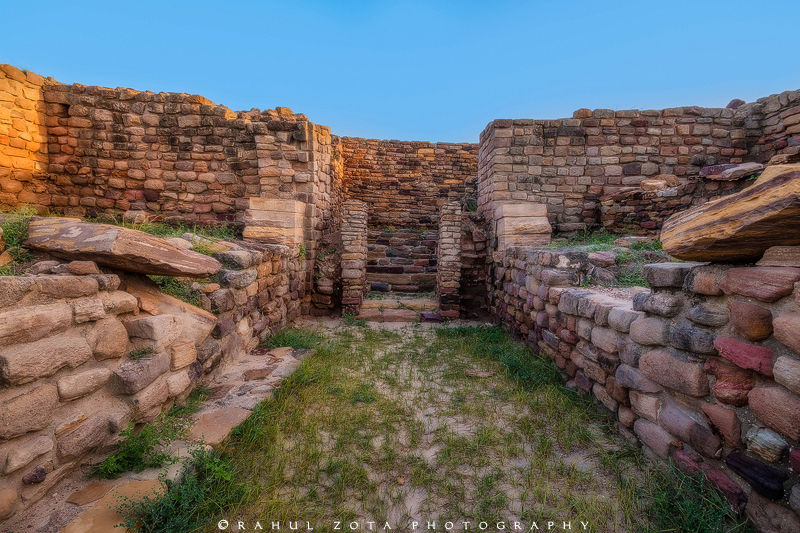
North Gate

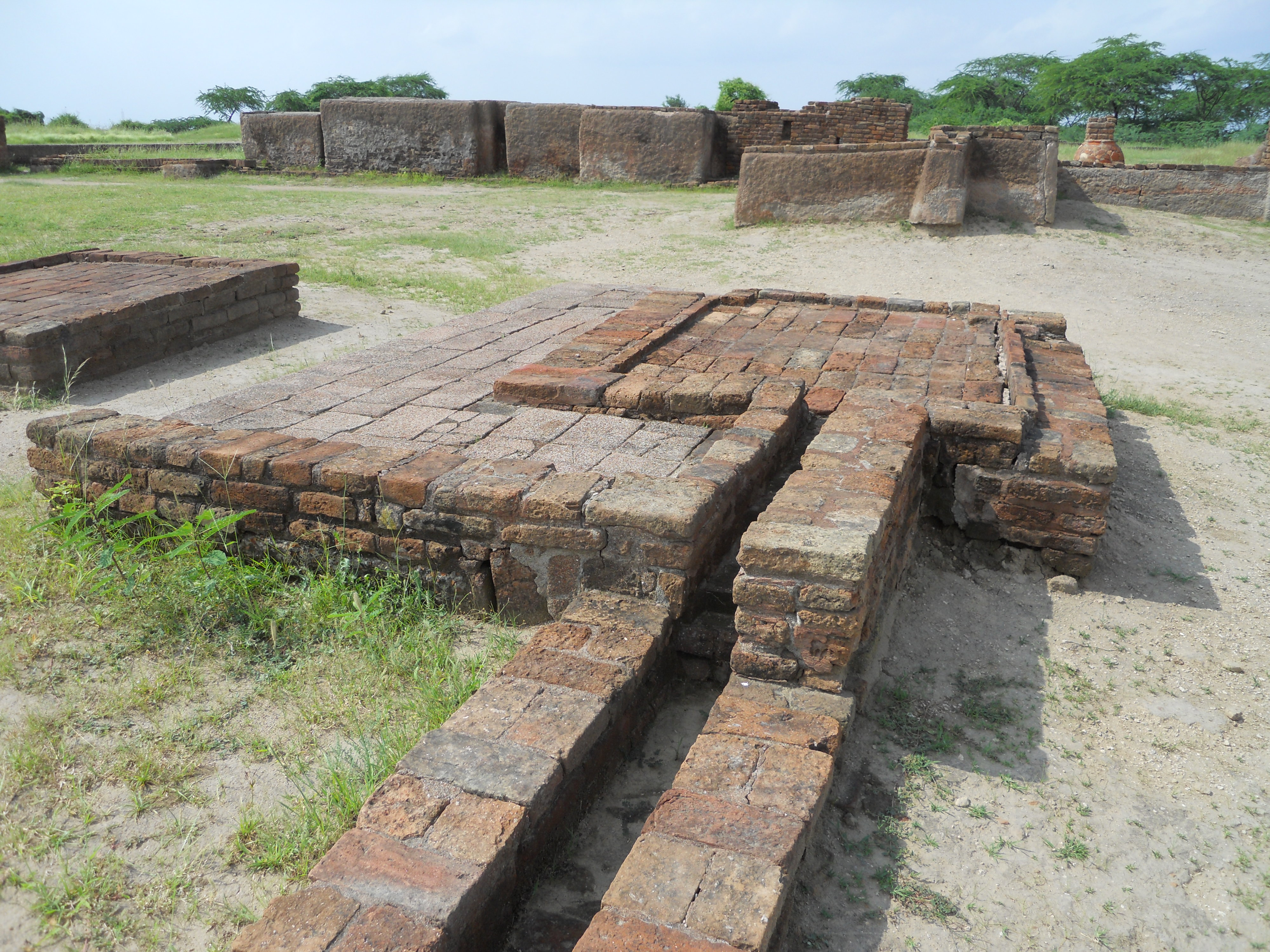
Drainage system from Lothal

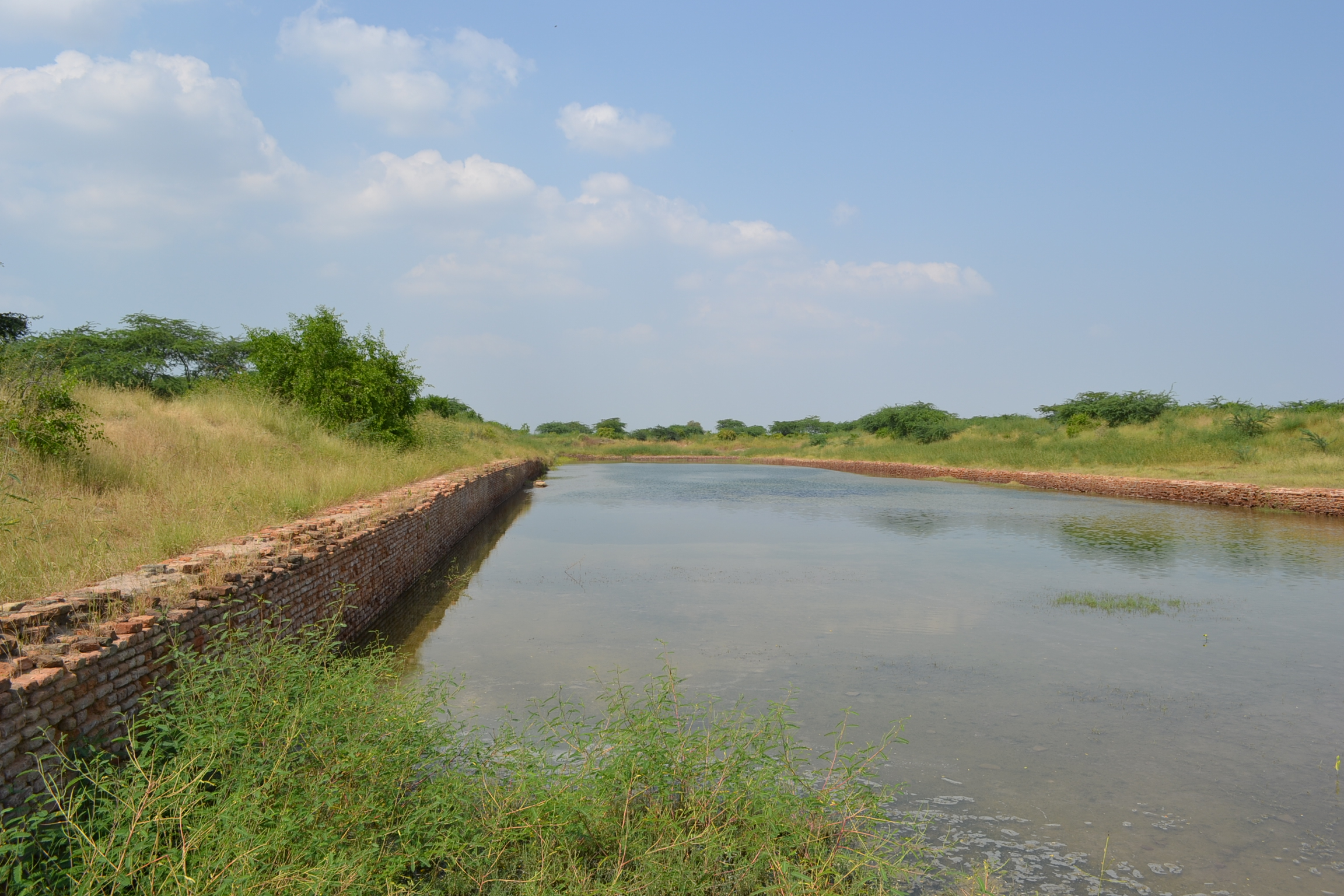
The dock, with a canal opening to allow water to flow into the river, thereby maintaining a stable water level, Lothal

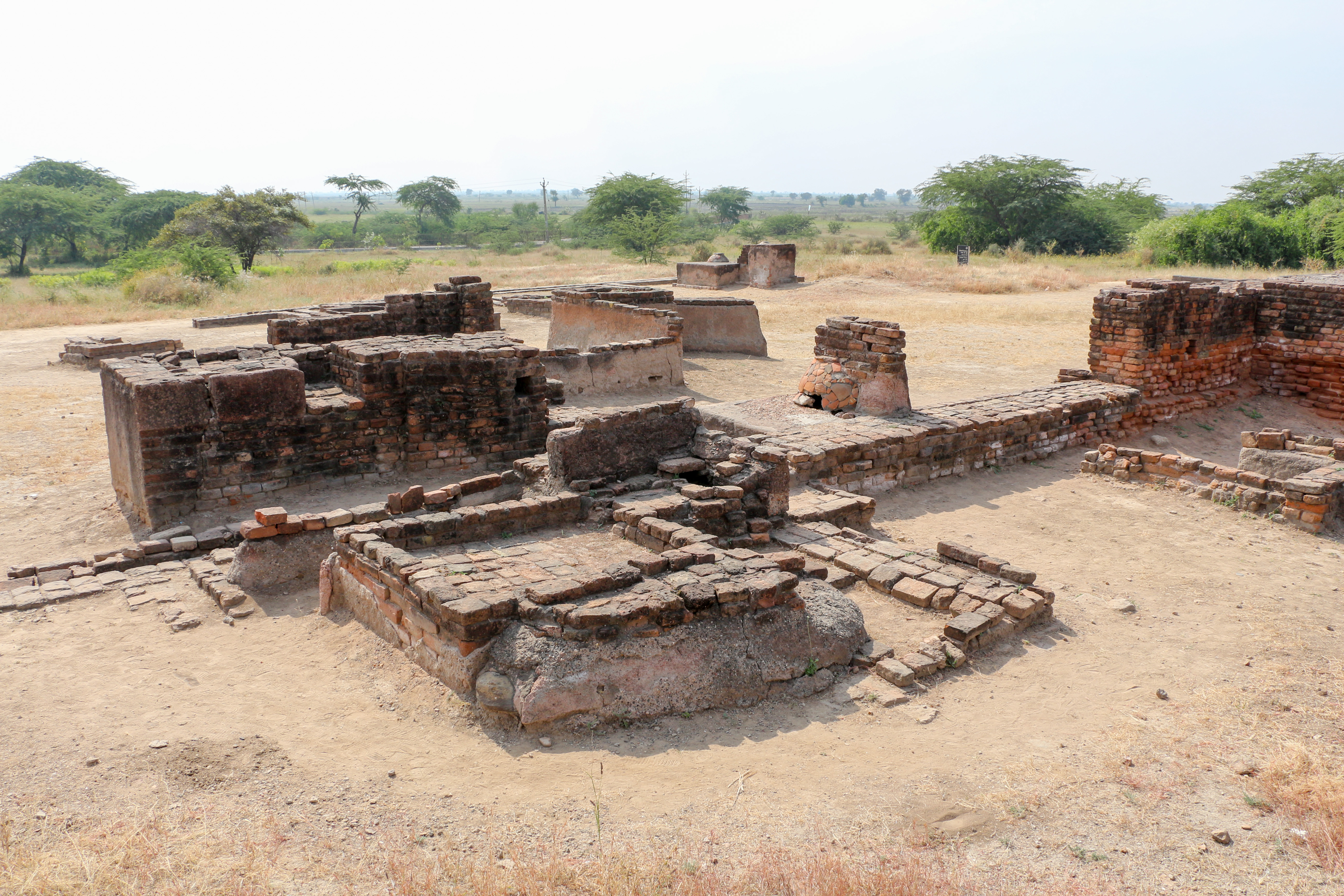
Bathroom structure from Lothal

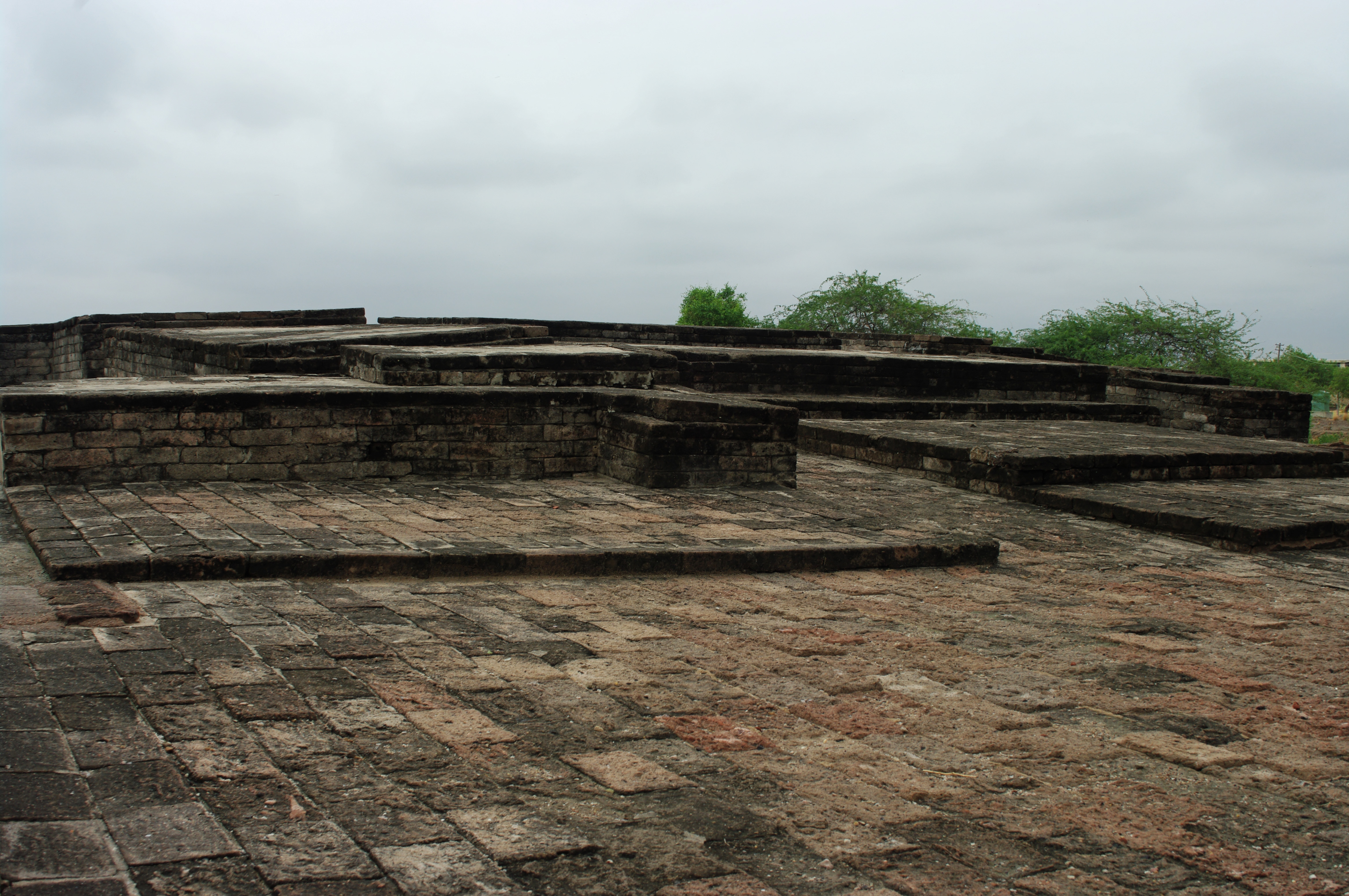
Archaeological feature, Lothal

==== Domestic architecture ====
The domestic houses were made of bricks and usually flat roofed, the wooden doors were provided with hangings and a lock at the bottom. The houses were single or double storied. The windows were provided with lattice shutters for airflow and privacy and ledge to stop rainwater from entering the house. The houses were usually provided with bathing platform which were connected to the public drain through in house drain. Latrines were generally simple commode had a small drain leading outside to a second sump pot. The latrines and bathing platforms were located in a room attached to the outer wall. Kitchen were open air situated in a courtyard as well as closed rooms, hearths oval, circular and rectangular in shape were also used in the house, keyhole ovens with central pillars were used for roasting meat or baking breads.

=== Late Harappan period ===
After the collapse of the mature Harappan urban period, some cities still remained urban and inhabited.

=== Non-Harappan architecture ===
Balathal defense architecture, stone and mud brick residential structures of Ahar Banas, defensive wall is characterised by mud based core having stone revetments with rectangular bastion dated c. 2400–1800 BCE, Sanghol and Rupar of Bara culture are some of the non Harappan chalcolithic urban developments that took place in India as well.

== Second Urbanization period (1025 BCE – 320 BCE) ==
With the appearance of towns in the middle Gangetic basin in the sixth century BCE, a second urbanization began in India.

Archaeological excavations at Kausambi have revealed fortifications from the end of second millennium BC.

A stone palace predating the Mauryan period has been discovered from the ruins of Kausambi. The dressed stones of the palace were set in fine lime and coated with a thick layer of plaster, the entire architecture resembled a fortress with its own walls and towers. The palace had few rooms, each room was provided with three shelves and a central hall with steps leading to the tower. The architecture was constructed in three phases and is dated from 8th century BCE to 2nd century BCE. Discovery of this stone palace discredits the theory of foreign influence behind the rise of Indian stone architecture during Ashokan or mauryan period.

A technique of architecture applied here was using dressed stones as facing for a wall made of rubble core, this represents the apogee of Indian architecture in this ancient period.

Kausambi palace architecture technique applied in later periods

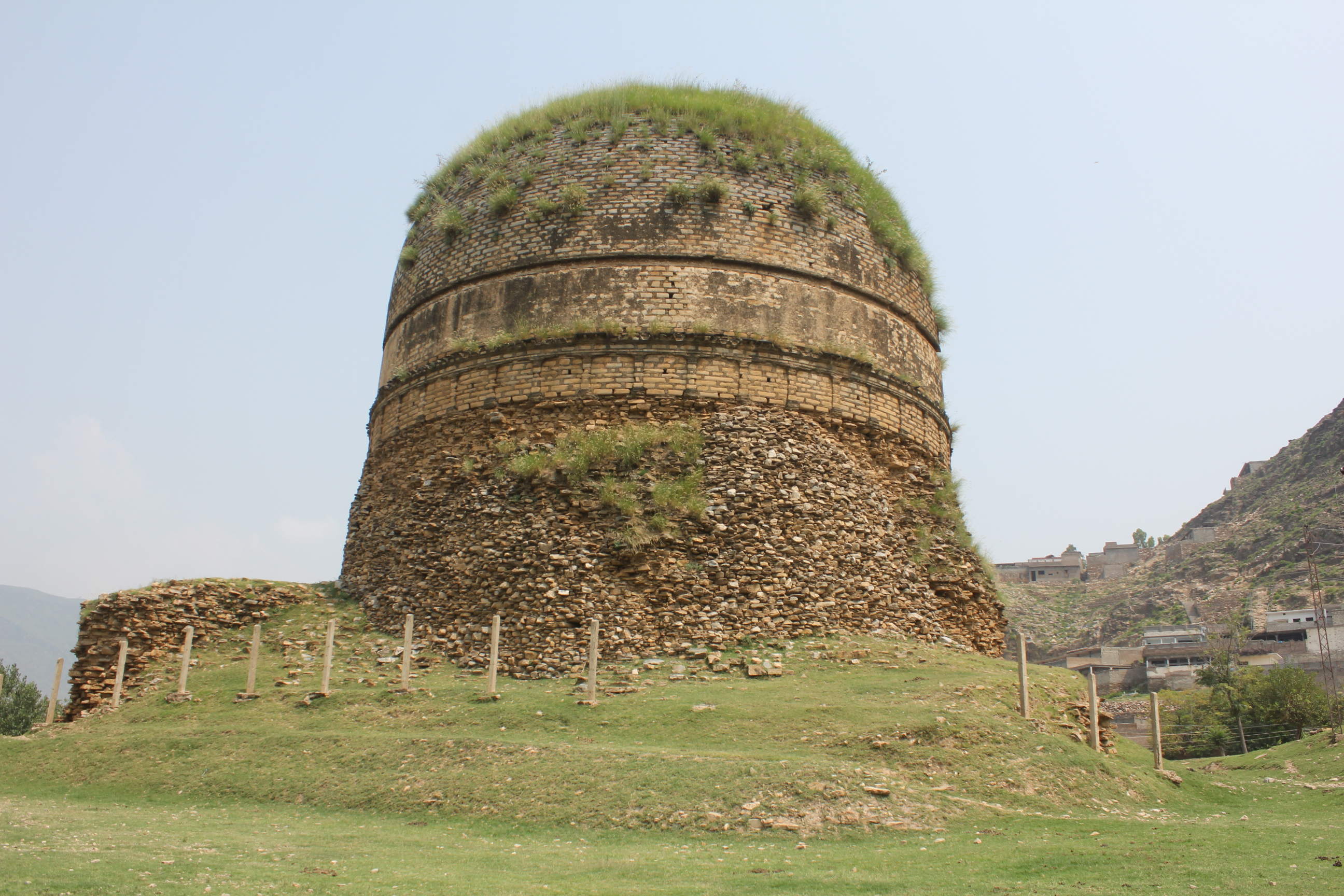
Dressed stone masonry on rubble wall technique applied to Shingardar Stupa, Swat, Gandhara, 1st-2nd century CE

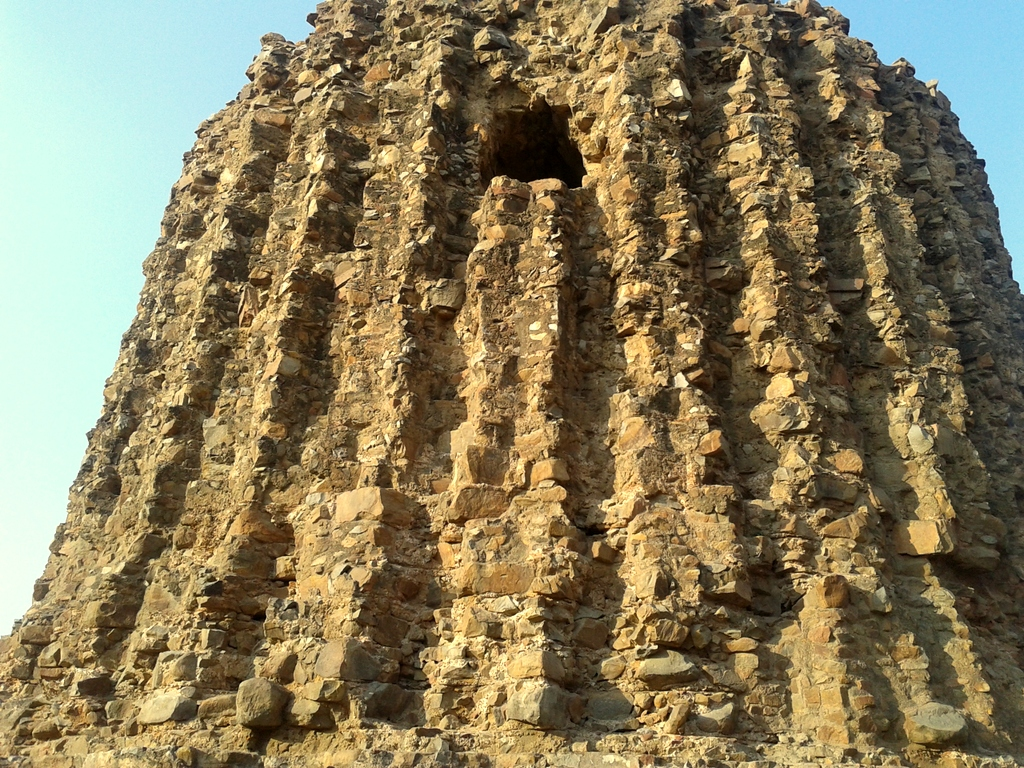
Unfinished Alai Minar's rubble core; the unfinished tower lacks sandstone facing.

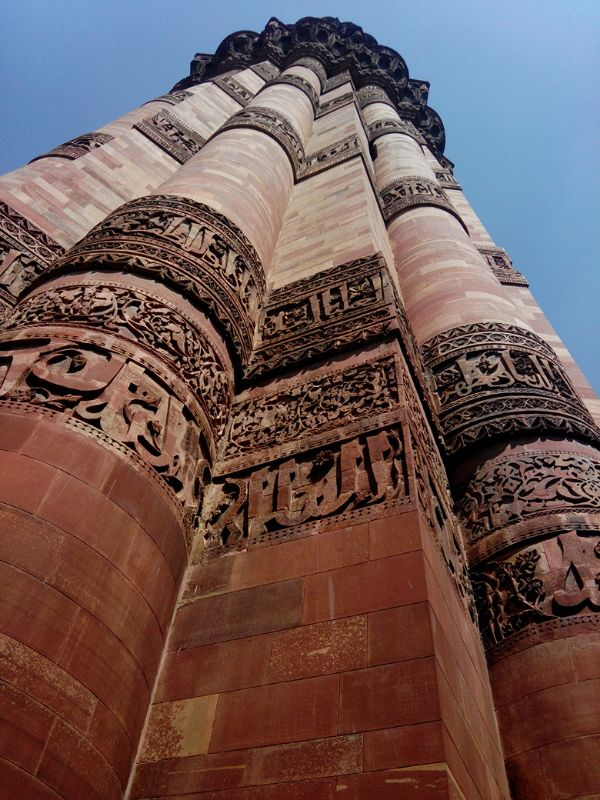
Stone facing of Qutub Minar on its rubble core

=== Ghositarama monastery ===
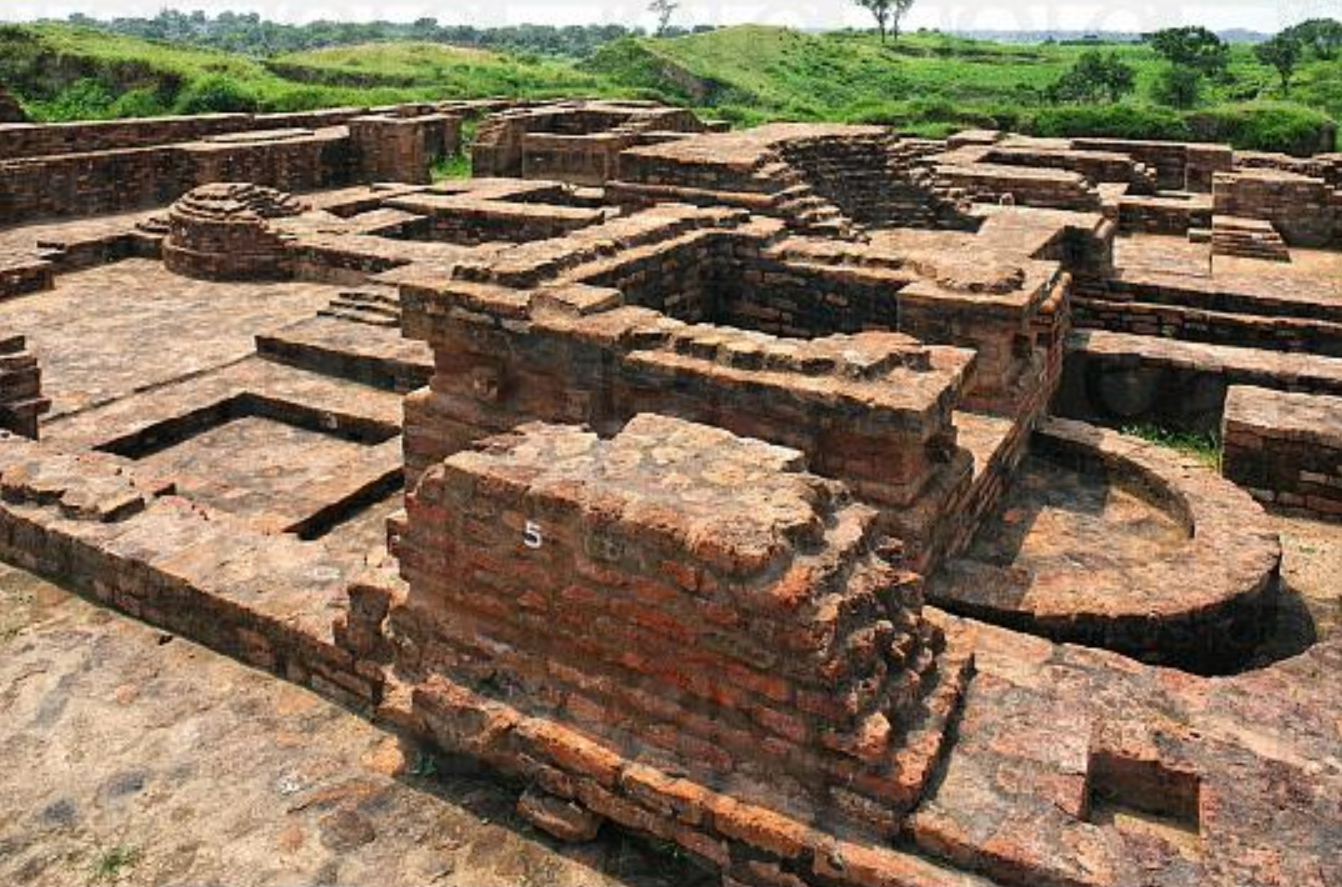
Ghoshitaram monastery in Kosambi dating back to 6th-century BCE

Ghoshitaram monastery in Kosambi dating back to 6th-century BCE. Buddhist scripture attributes this very old monastic site to the time of the Buddha which has been backed by archaeology, founded by a banker named Ghosita.

=== Mahajanapadas ===
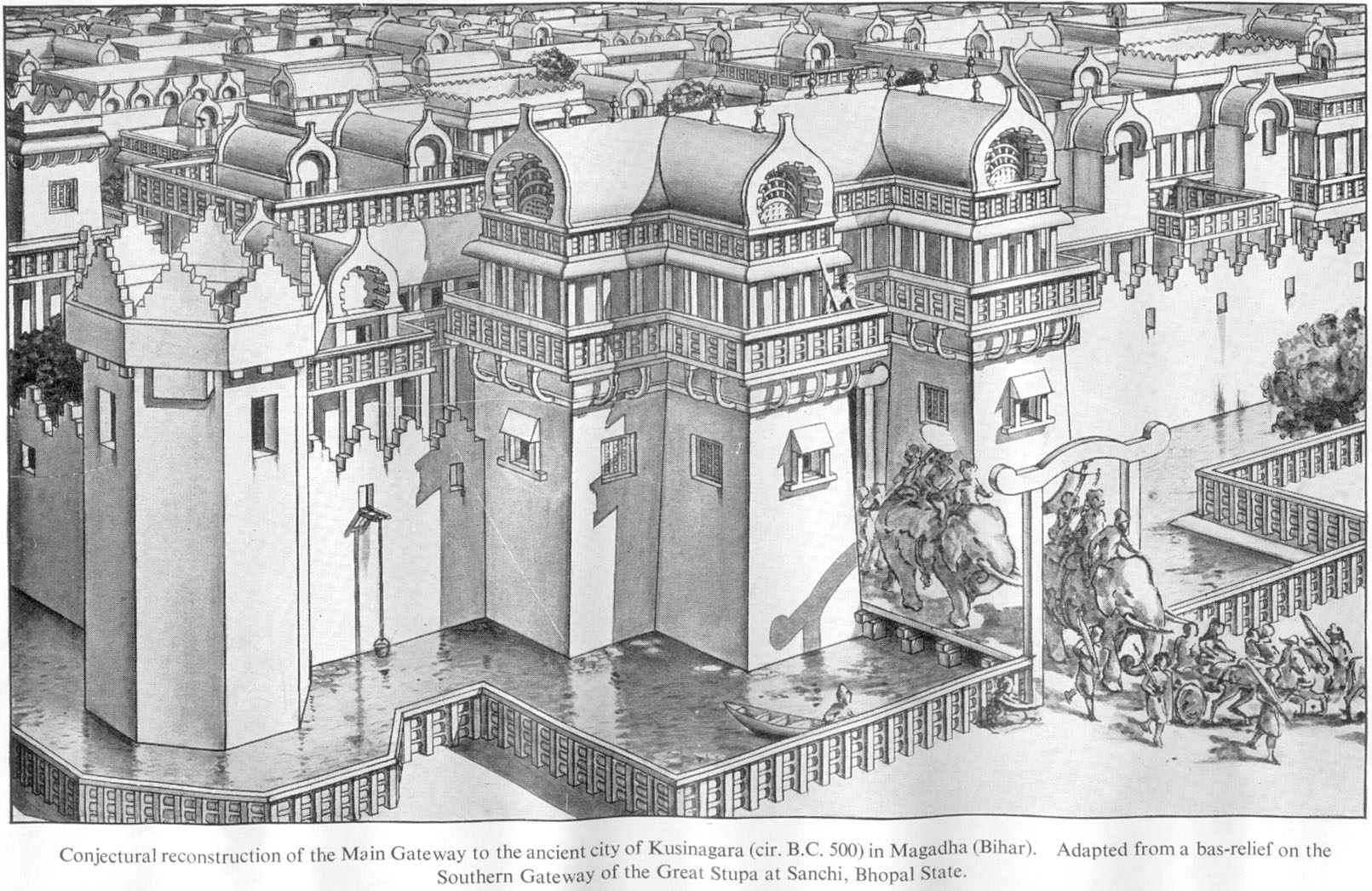
Conjectural reconstruction of the main gate of Kushinagar c. 500 BCE adapted from a relief at Sanchi

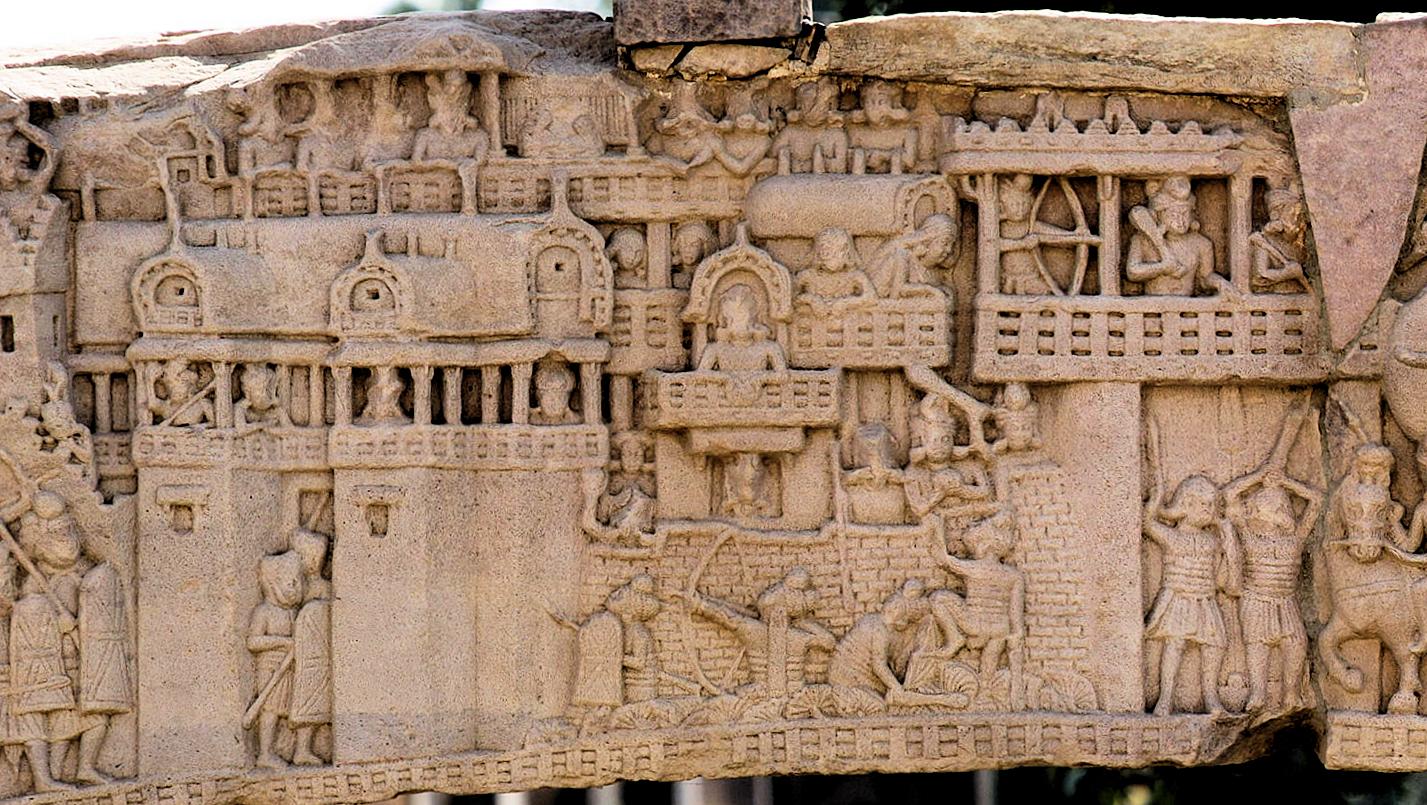
City of Kushinagar in the 5th century BCE according to a 1st-century BCE frieze in Sanchi Stupa 1 Southern Gate

From the time of the Mahajanapadas (600 BCE–320 BCE), walled and moated cities with large gates and multi-storied buildings which consistently used arched windows and doors and made intense use of wooden architecture, are important features of the architecture during this period. The reliefs of Sanchi, dated to the 1st centuries BCE–CE, show cities such as Kushinagar or Rajagriha as splendid walled cities during the time of the Buddha (6th century BCE). Archaeologically, this period corresponds in part to the Northern Black Polished Ware culture.

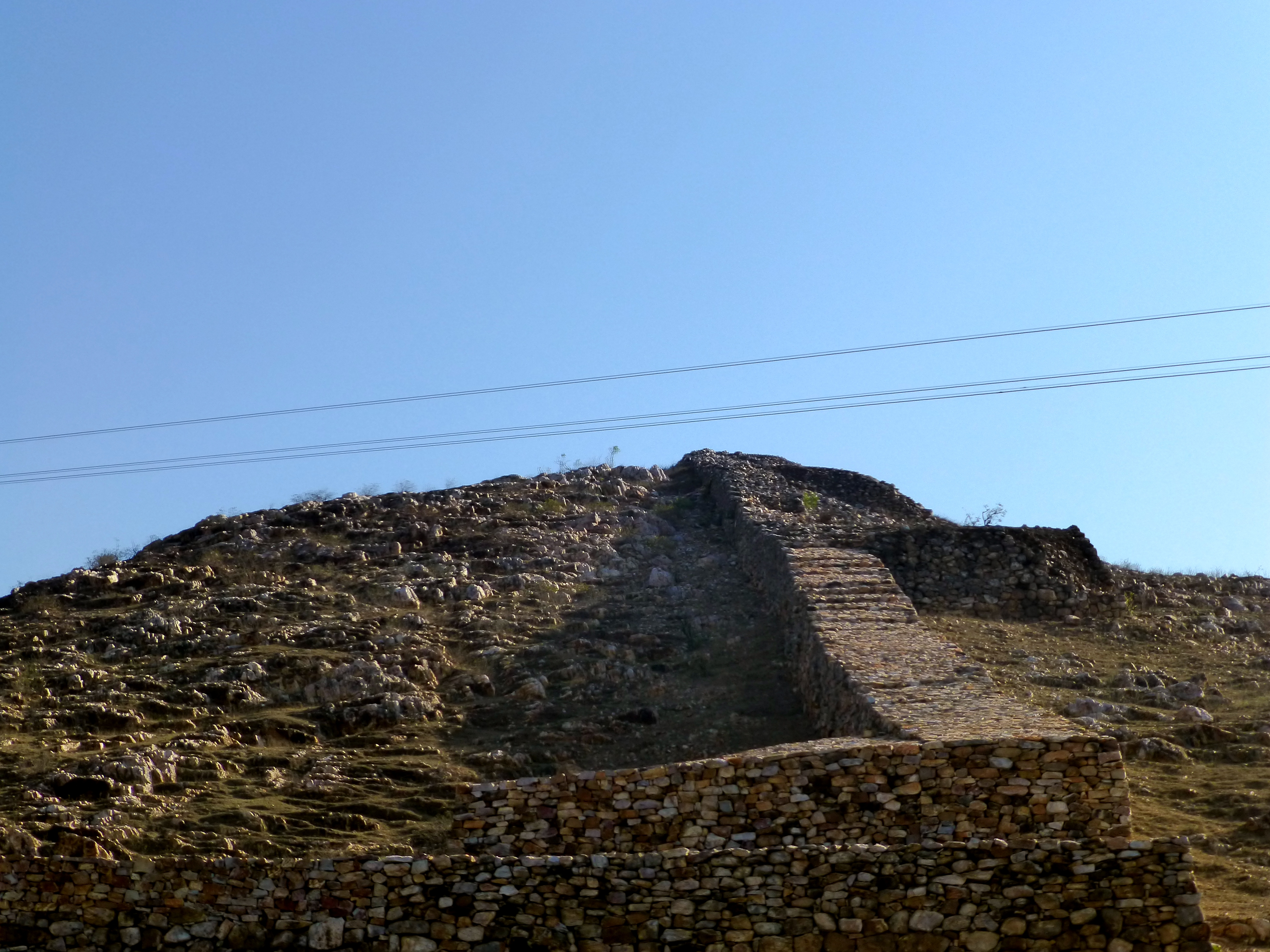
Rajgir, old city walls 6th century BCE

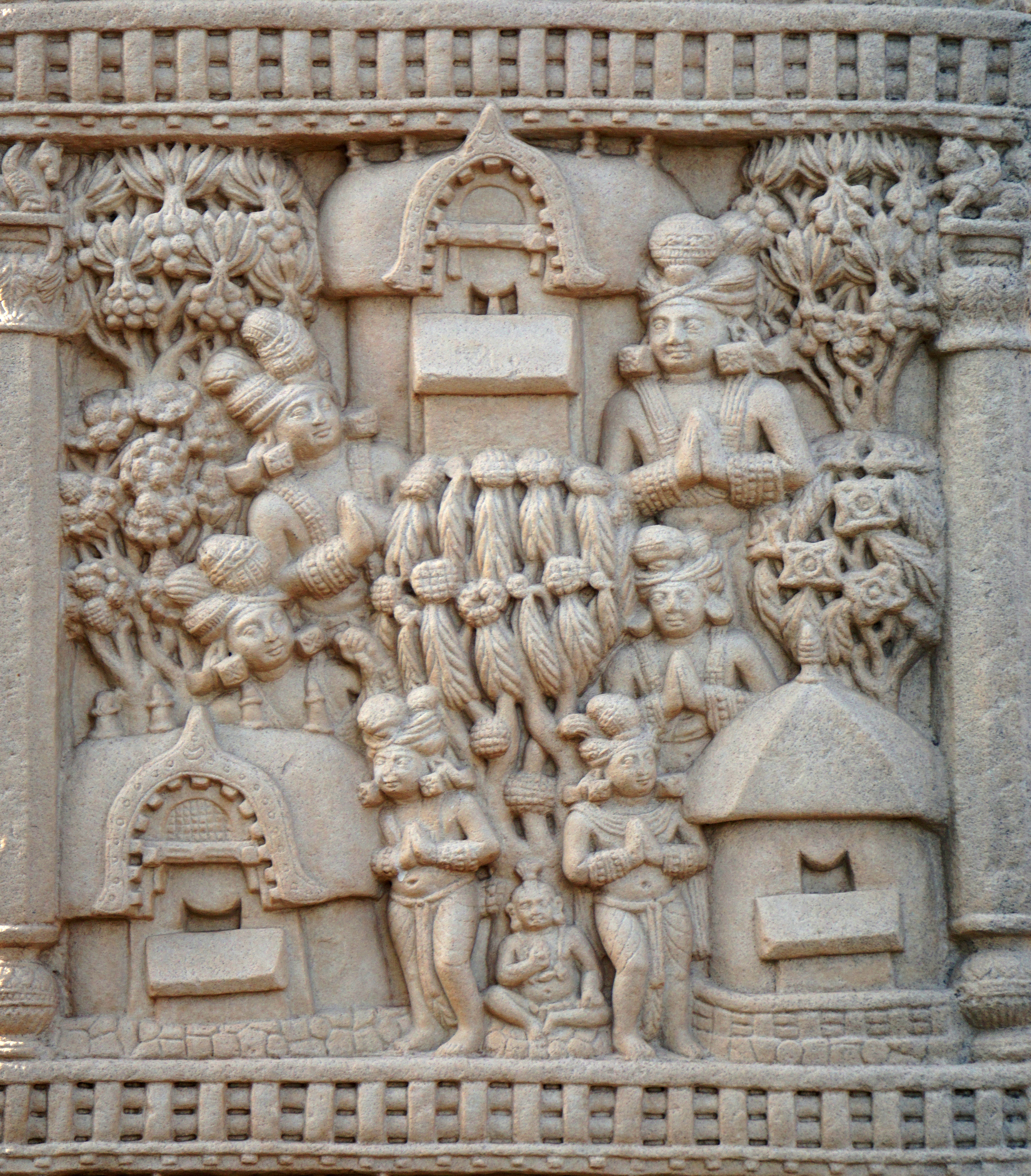
Jetavana of Sravasti, Sanchi Stupa 1, Northern Gateway

Various types of individual housing of the time of the Buddha (c. 563/480 or c. 483/400 BCE), resembling huts with chaitya-decorated doors, are also described in the reliefs of Sanchi. Although the reliefs of Sanchi are dated to the 1st centuries BCE–CE, portraying scene taking place during the time of the Buddha, four centuries before, they are considered an important indication of building traditions in these early times.

==== Buddhist caves ====
During the time of the Buddha (c. 563/480 or c. 483/400 BCE), Buddhist monks were also in the habit of using natural caves, such as the Saptaparni Cave, southwest from Rajgir, Bihar. Many believe it to be the site in which Buddha spent some time before his death, and where the first Buddhist council was held after the Buddha died (paranirvana). The Buddha himself had also used the Indrasala Cave for meditation, starting a tradition of using caves, natural or man-made, as religious retreats, that would last for over a millennium.

==== Monasteries ====
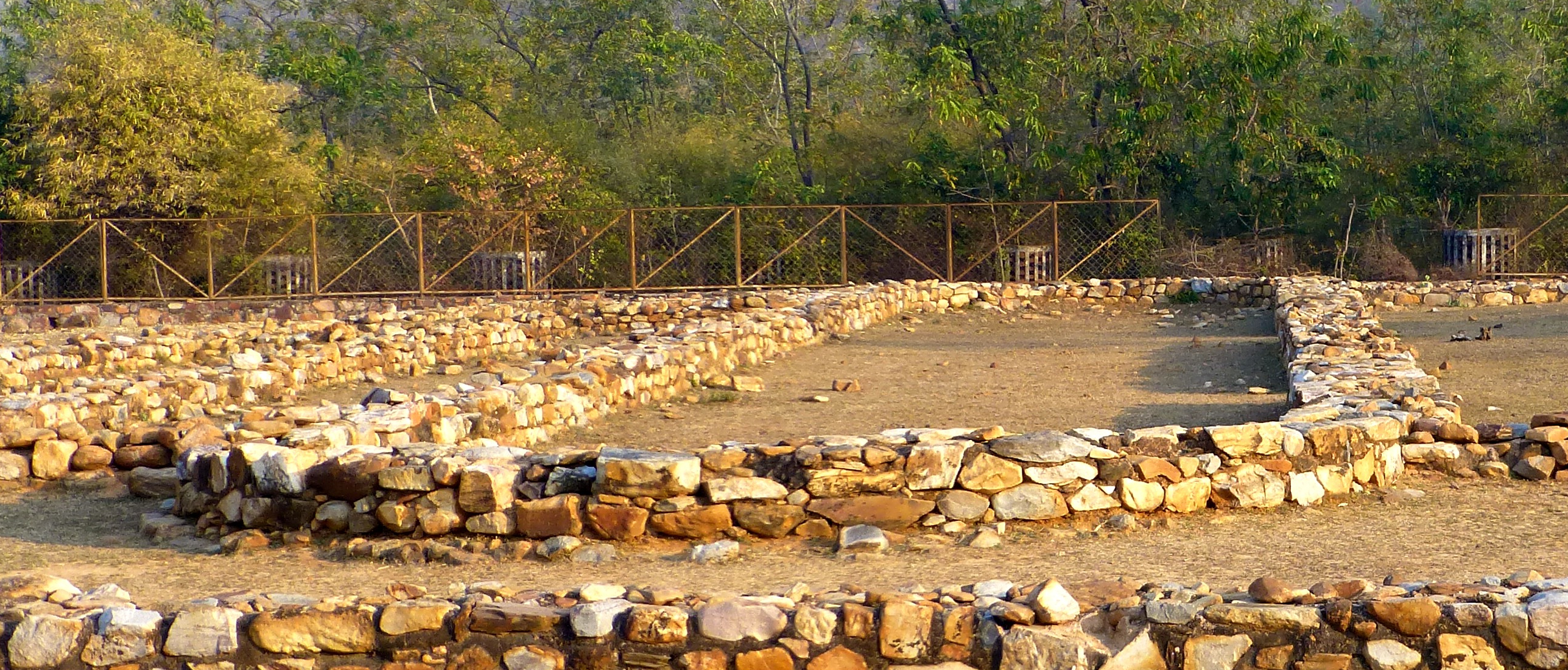
Jivakarama vihara monastery. Oblong communal hall (remains), 6th century BCE

The first monasteries, such as the Jivakarama vihara and Ghositarama monastery in Rajgir and Kausambi respectively, were built from the time of the Buddha, in the 6th or 5th centuries BCE. The initial Jivakarama monastery was formed of two long parallel and oblong halls, large dormitories where the monks could eat and sleep, in conformity with the original regulations of the samgha, without any private cells. Other halls were then constructed, mostly long, oblong building as well, which remind of the construction of several of the Barabar caves.

==== Stupas ====
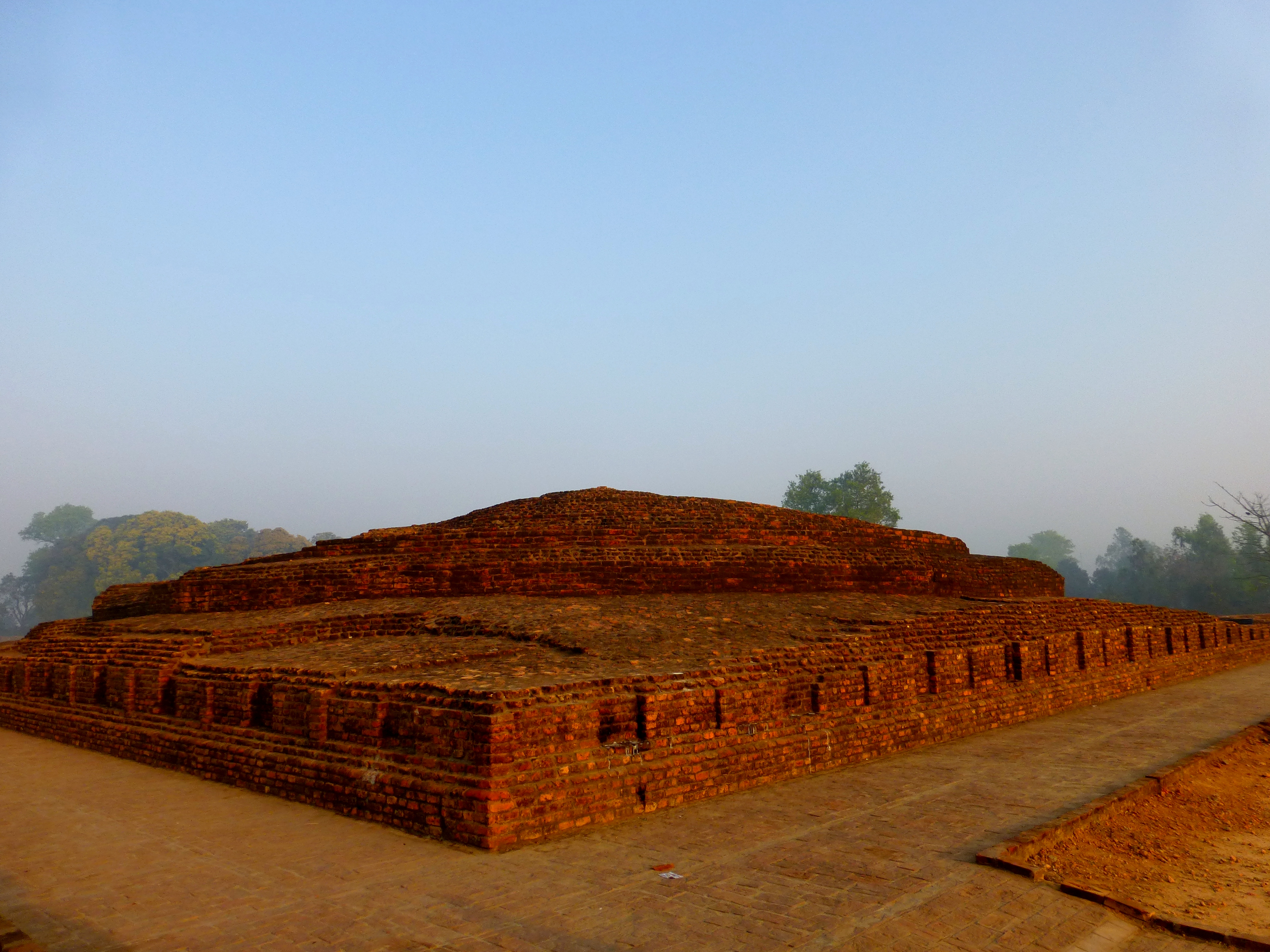
Stupas at Piprahwa are some of the earliest surviving stupas.

Religious buildings in the form of the Buddhist stupa, a dome-shaped monument, started to be used in India as commemorative monuments associated with storing sacred relics of the Buddha.

== Classical period (320 BCE – 550 CE) ==
=== Monumental stone architecture ===
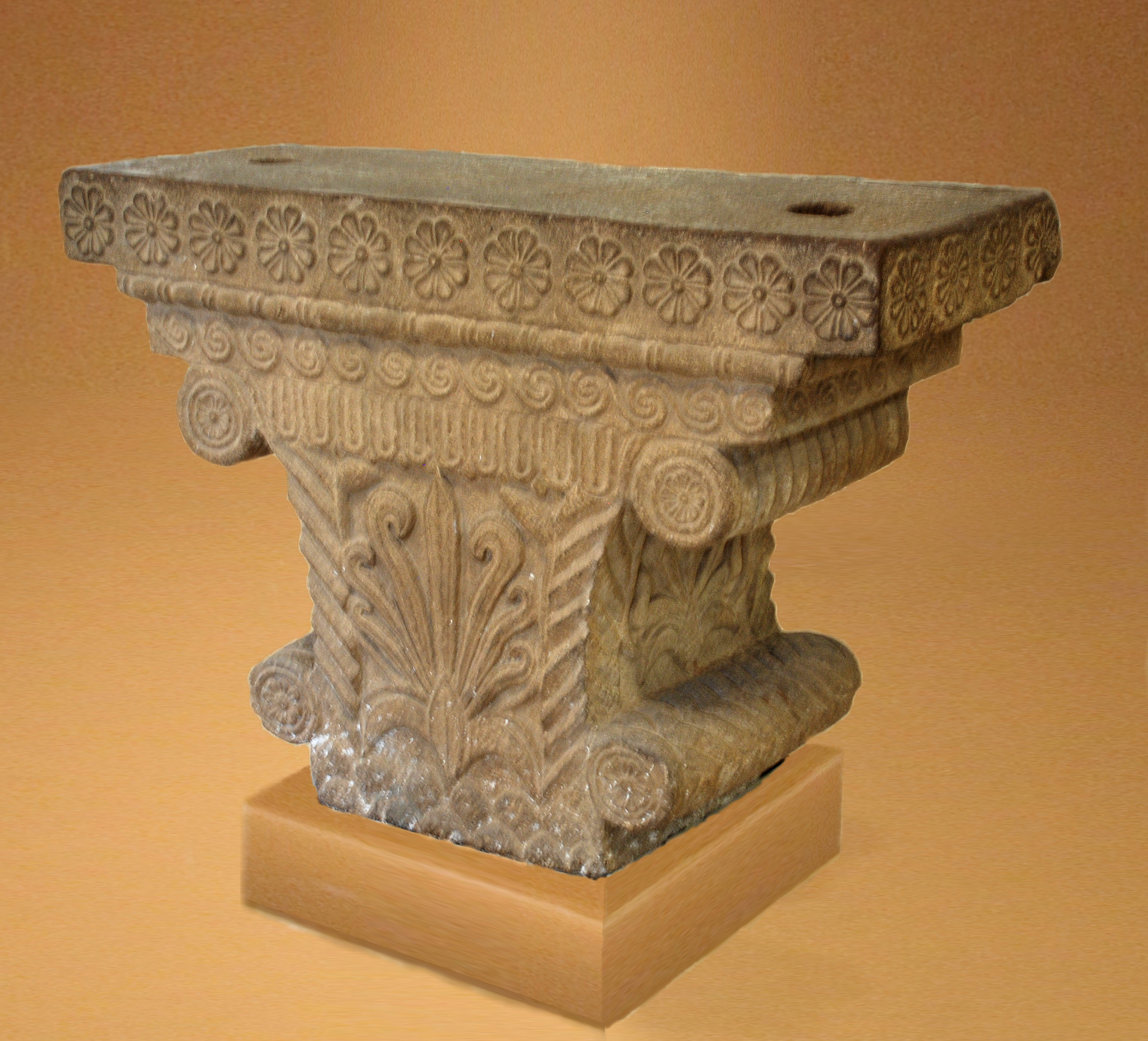
The Pataliputra capital, discovered at the Bulandi Bagh site of Pataliputra, c. 4th–3rd BCE

The next wave of building, appears with the start of the Classical period (320 BCE–550 CE) and the rise of the Mauryan Empire. The capital city of Pataliputra was an urban marvel described by the Greek ambassador Megasthenes. Remains of monumental stone architecture can be seen through numerous artifacts recovered from Pataliputra, such as the Pataliputra capital. This cross-fertilization between different art streams converging on the subcontinent produced new forms that, while retaining the essence of the past, succeeded in integrating selected elements of the new influences.

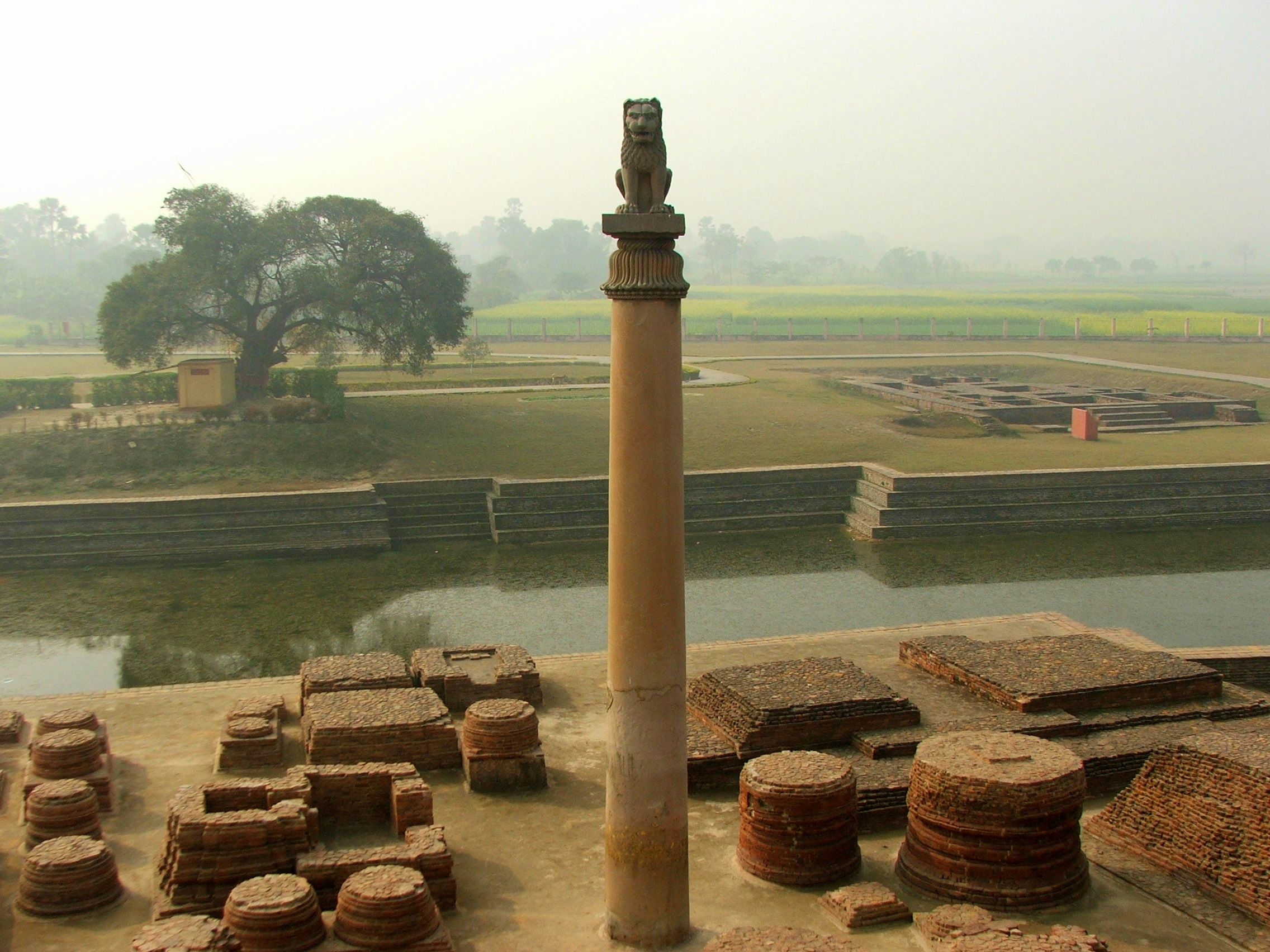
Ashoka pillar at Vaishali, 250 BCE

The Indian emperor Ashoka (rule: 273–232 BCE) established the Pillars of Ashoka throughout his realm, generally next to Buddhist stupas. According to Buddhist tradition, Ashoka recovered the relics of the Buddha from the earlier stupas (except from the Ramagrama stupa), and erected 84.000 stupas to distribute the relics across India. In effect, many stupas are thought to date originally from the time of Ashoka, such as Sanchi or Kesariya, where he also erected pillars with his inscriptions, and possibly Bharhut, Amaravati or Dharmarajika in Gandhara.

Ashoka also built the initial Mahabodhi Temple in Bodh Gaya around the Bodhi tree, including masterpieces such as the Diamond throne ("Vajrasana"). He is also said to have established a chain of hospitals throughout the Mauryan Empire by 230 BCE. One of the edicts of Ashoka reads: "Everywhere King Piyadasi (Ashoka) erected two kinds of hospitals, hospitals for people and hospitals for animals. Where there were no healing herbs for people and animals, he ordered that they be bought and planted." Indian art and culture has absorbed extraneous impacts by varying degrees and is much richer for this exposure.

Fortified cities with stūpas, viharas, and temples were constructed during the Maurya Empire (c. 321–185 BCE). Architectural creations of the Mauryan period, such as the city of Pataliputra, the Pillars of Ashoka, are outstanding in their achievements, and often compare favourably with the rest of the world at that time. Commenting on Mauryan sculpture, John Marshall once wrote about the "extraordinary precision and accuracy which characterizes all Mauryan works, and which has never, we venture to say, been surpassed even by the finest workmanship on Athenian buildings".

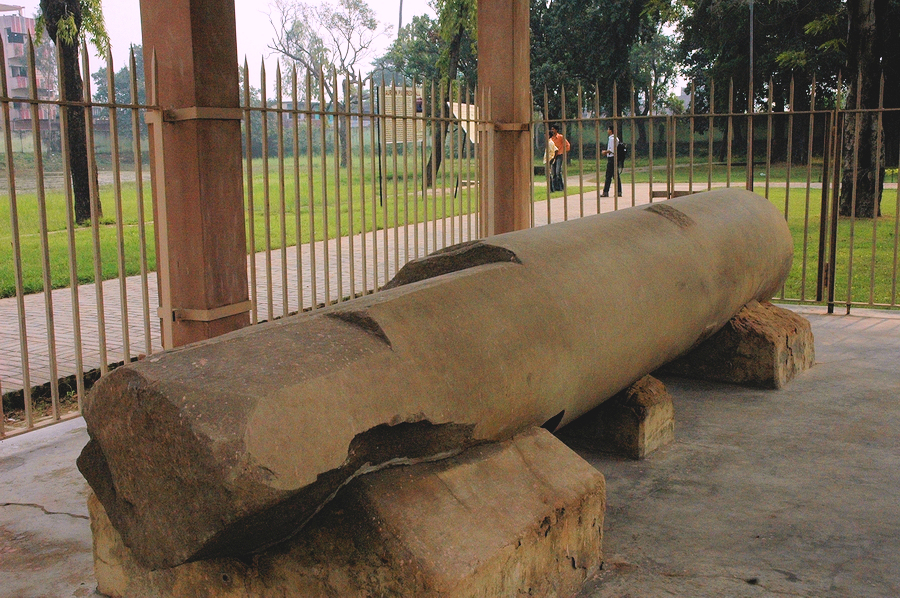
Mauryan polished stone pillar from Pataliputra

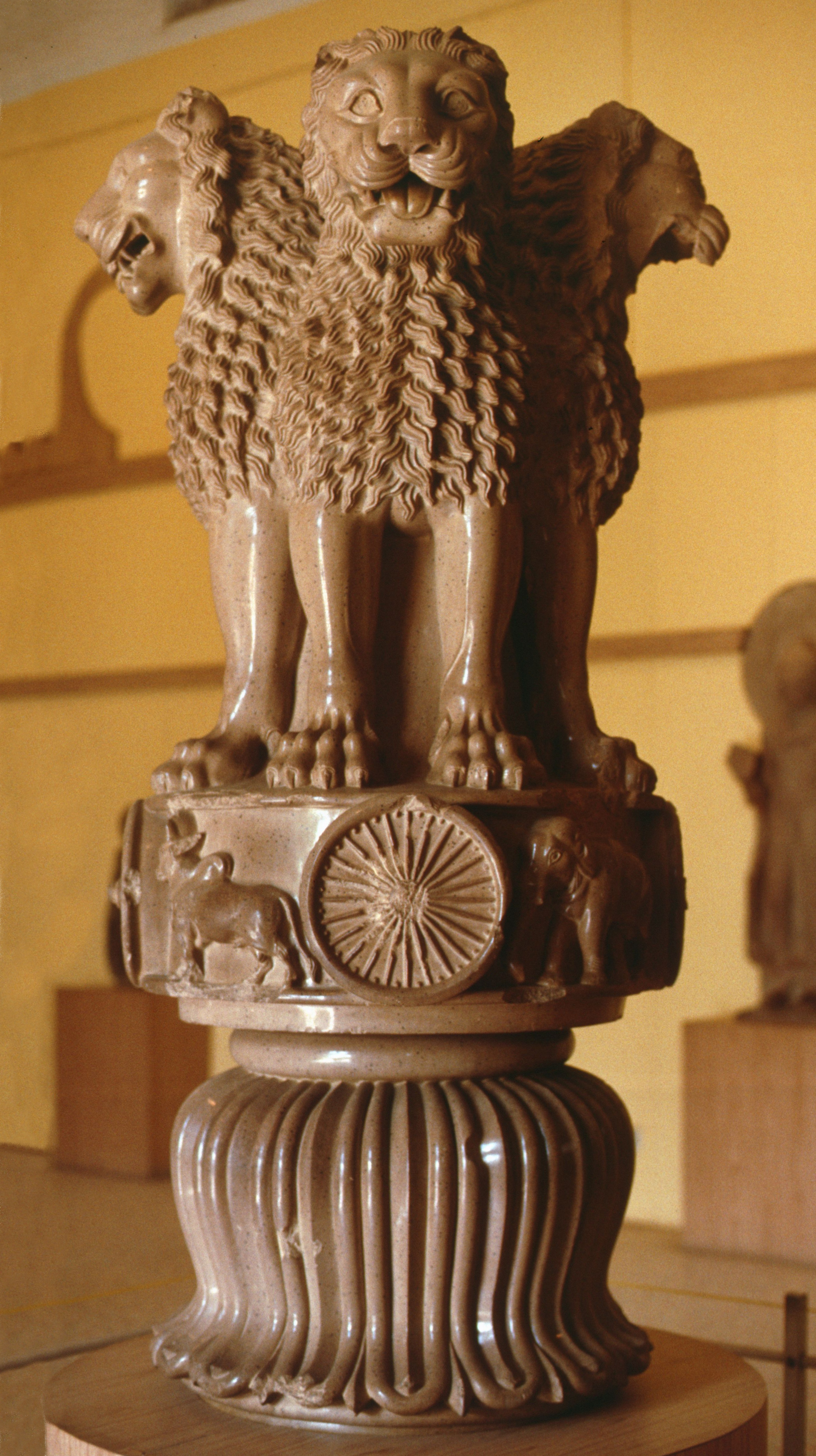
Lion Capital of Ashoka from Sarnath, 250 BCE.

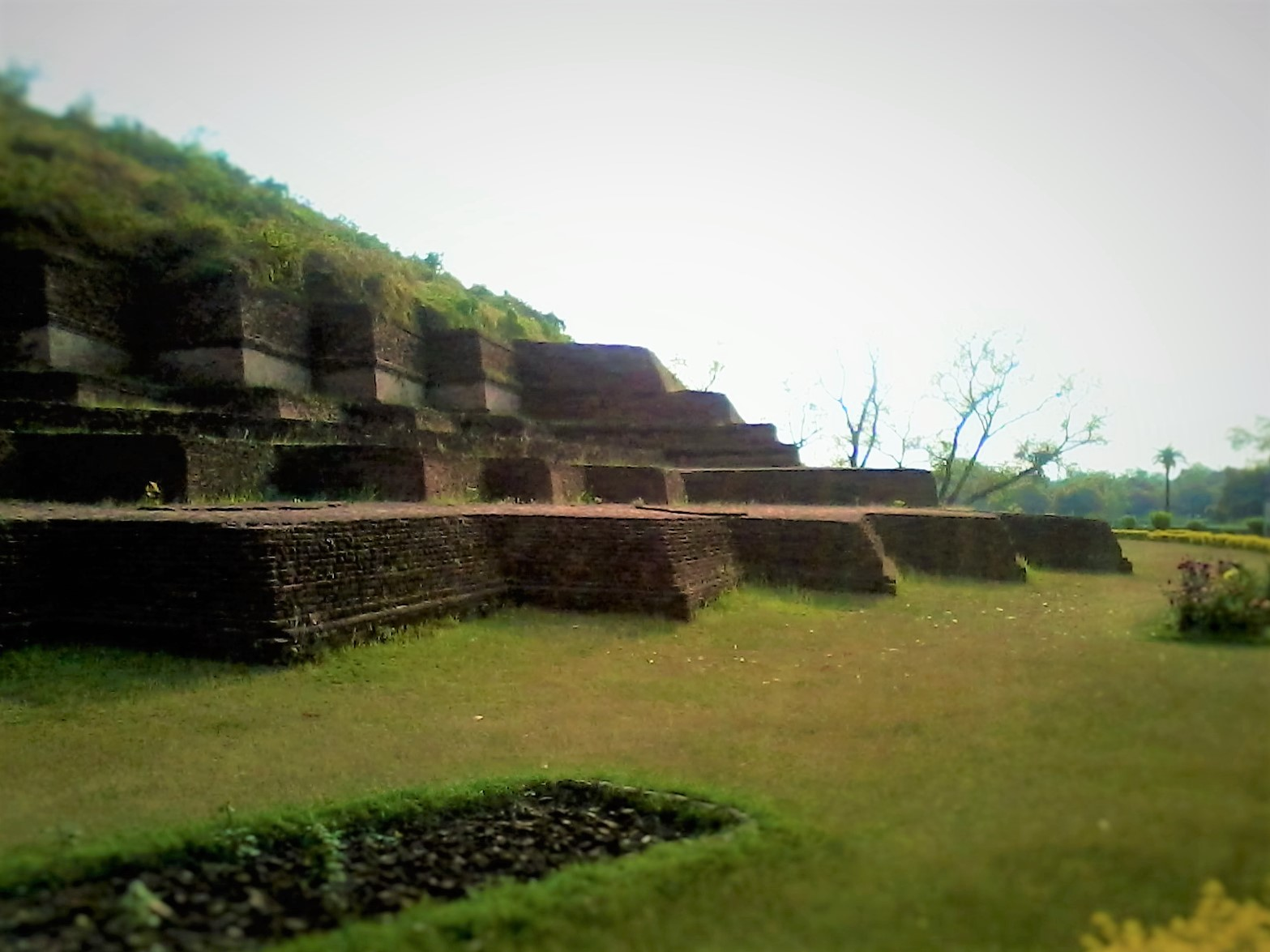
Cruciform star-shaped stupa Lauriya Nandangarh – 4th–3rd century BC stage 1 cruciform, 1 BC stage 3 colossal stupa

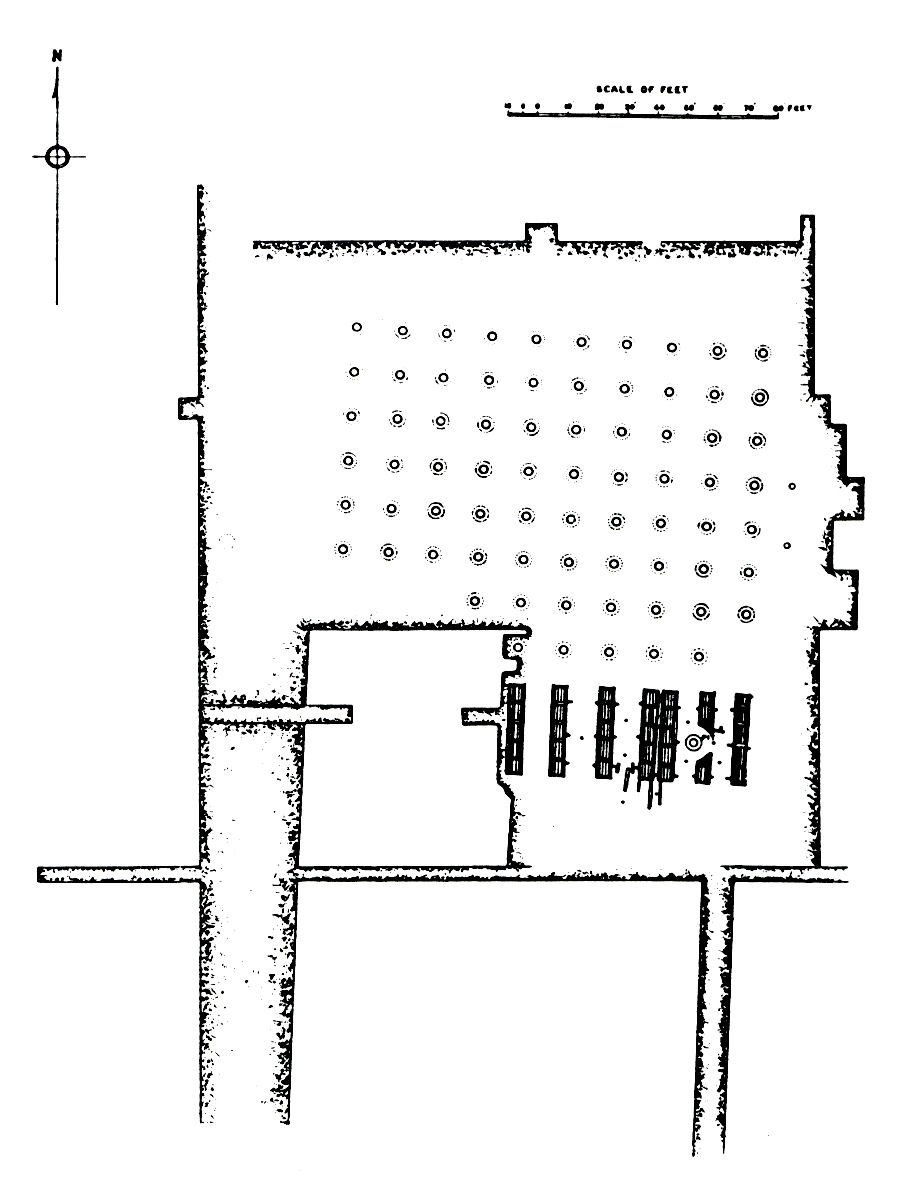
Plan of the 80-columns pillared hall

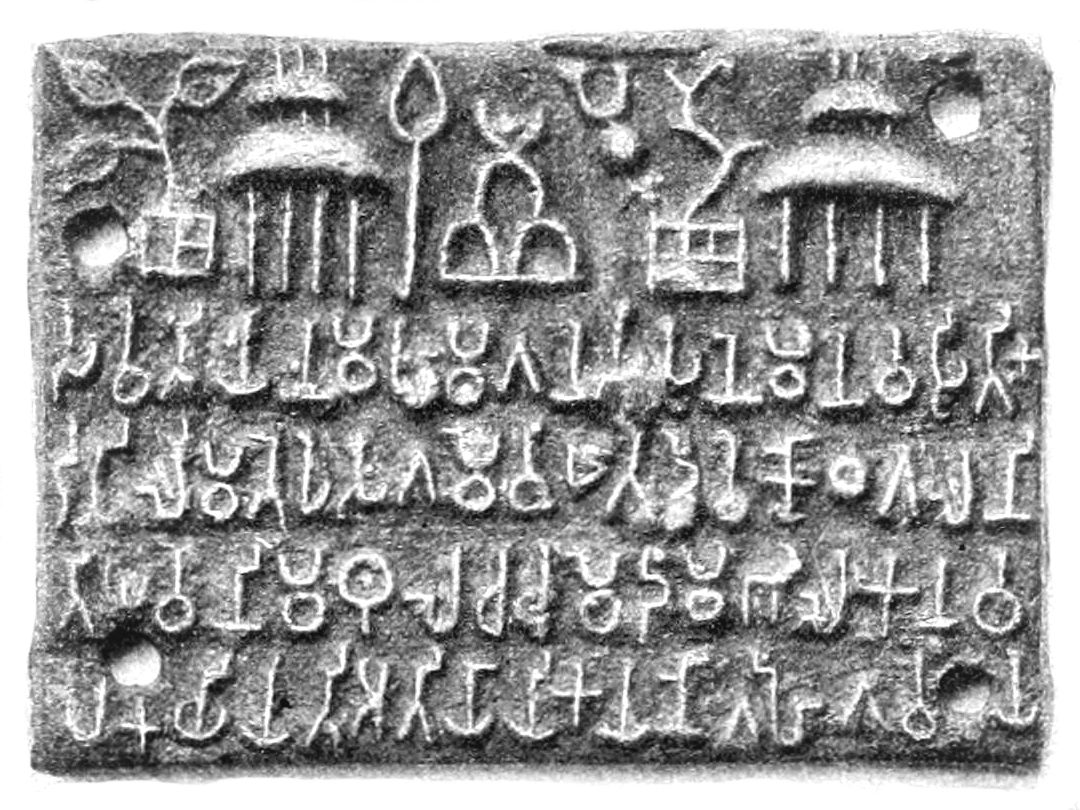
Soghaura copper plate 3rd century BCE

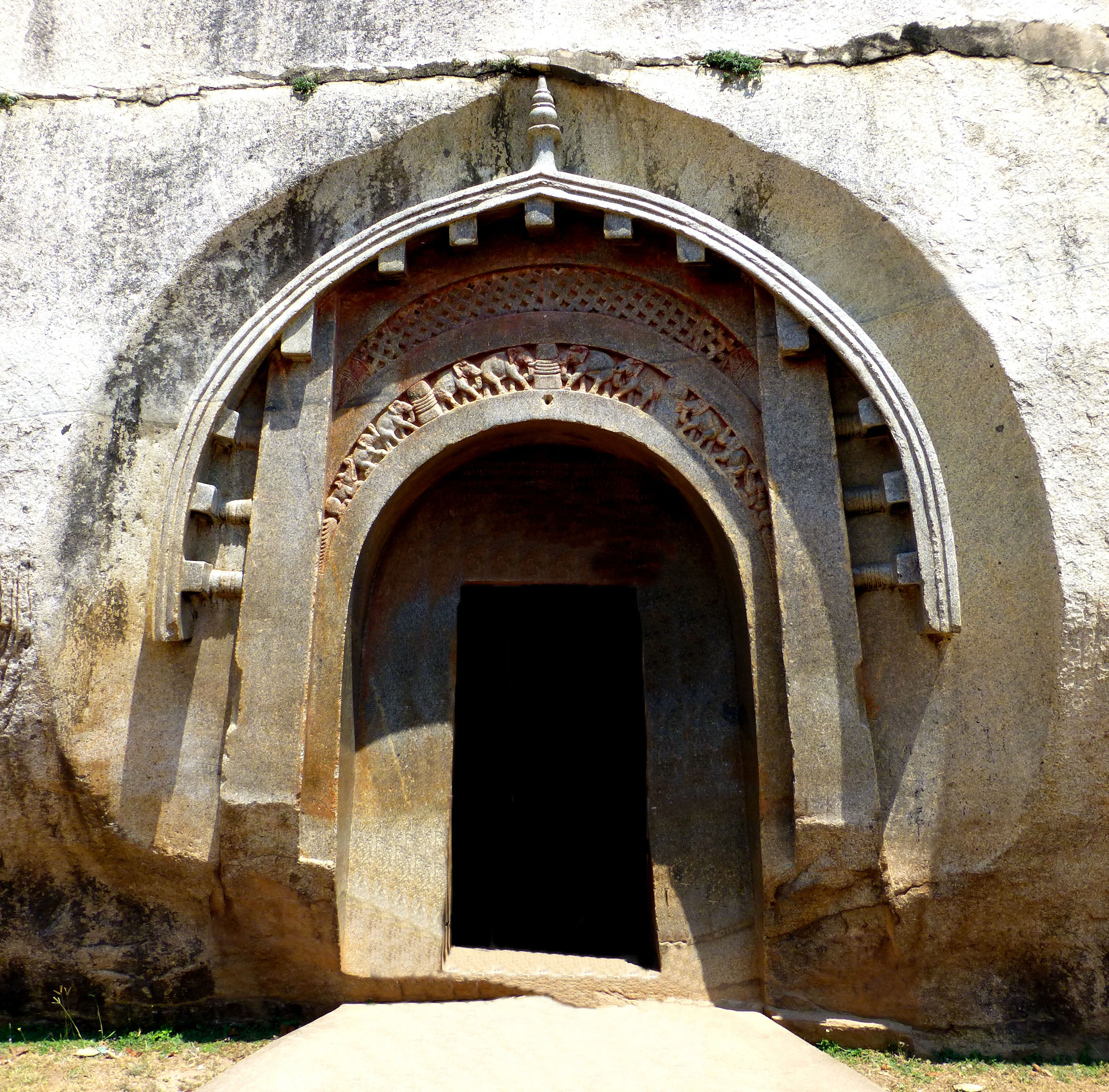
The famous carved door of Lomas Rishi, one of the Barabar Caves, dated to approximately 250 BCE, displaying the first known Maurya reliefs

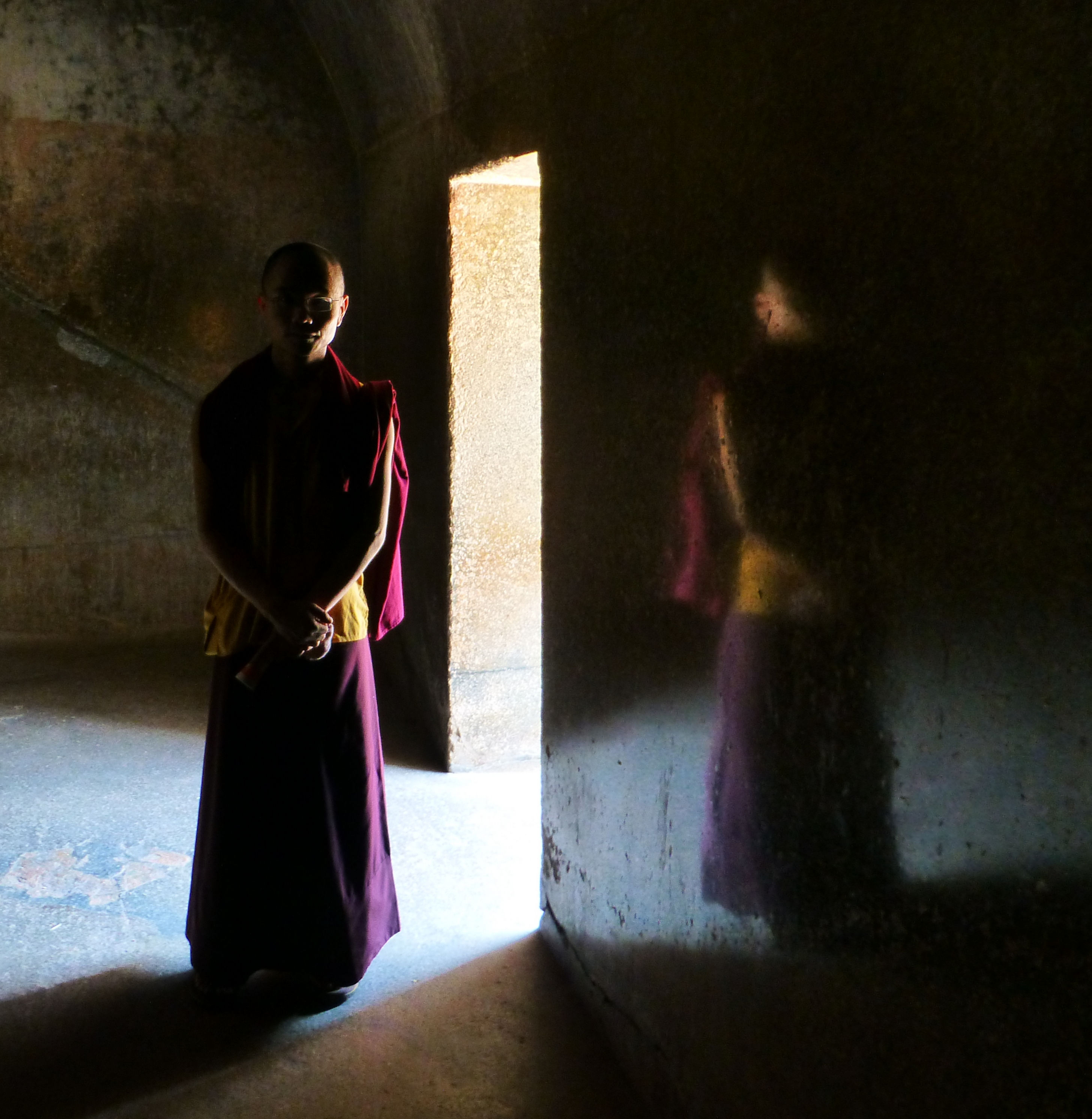
The quasi-perfect walls of the Barabar Caves were dug into the hard rock and polished to a mirror effect c. 250 BCE, date of the inscriptions of Ashoka.

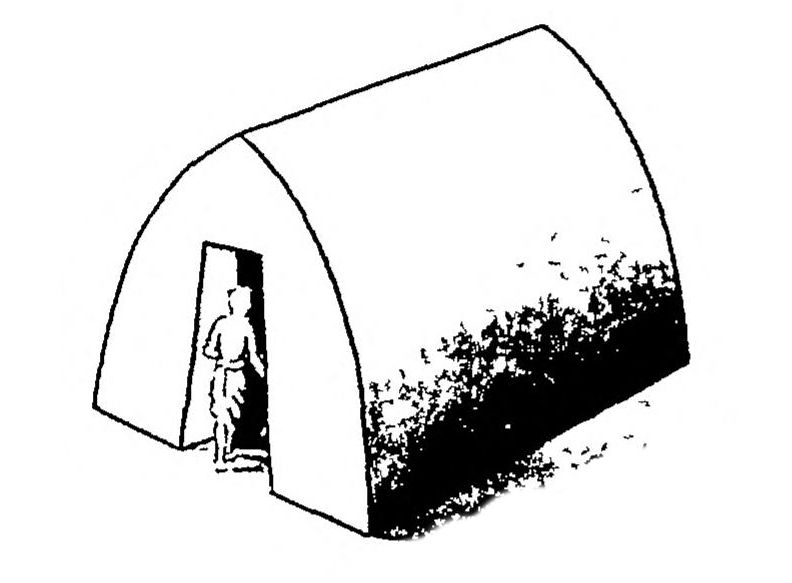
Gothic vault plan of Sitamarhi Cave 3rd century BCE

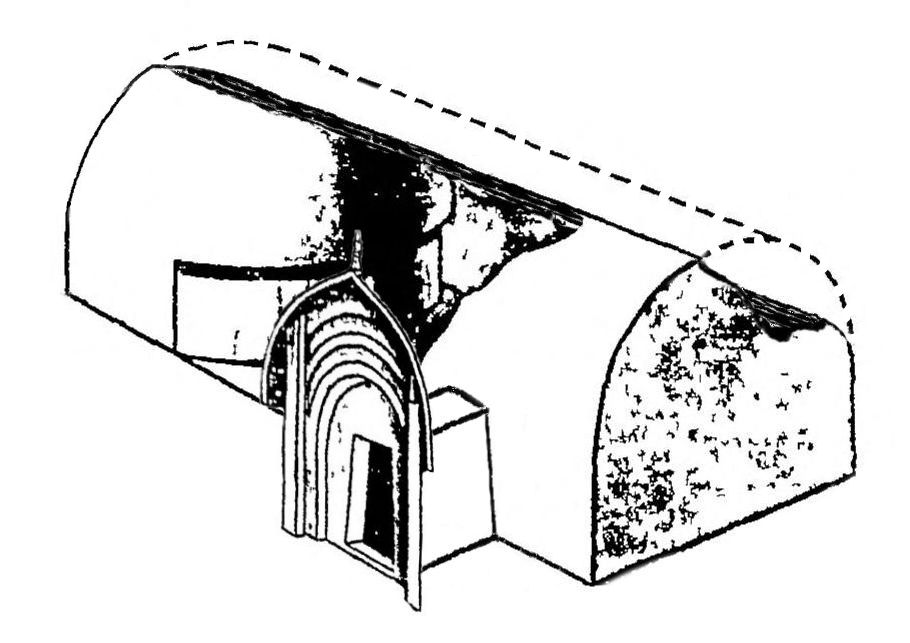
Barrel apsidal vault plan of Lomas Rishi Cave, 3rd century BCE

=== Rock-cut caves ===
Around the same time rock-cut architecture began to develop, starting with the already highly sophisticated and state-sponsored Barabar caves in Bihar, personally dedicated by Ashoka c. 250 BCE. These artificial caves exhibit an amazing level of technical proficiency, the extremely hard granite rock being cut in geometrical fashion and polished to a mirror-like finish.

Probably owing to the 2nd century BCE fall of the Mauryan Empire and the subsequent persecutions of Buddhism under Pushyamitra Sunga, it is thought that many Buddhists relocated to the Deccan under the protection of the Andhra dynasty, thus shifting the cave-building effort to western India: an enormous effort at creating religious caves (usually Buddhist or Jain) continued there until the 2nd century CE, culminating with the Karla Caves or the Pandavleni Caves.

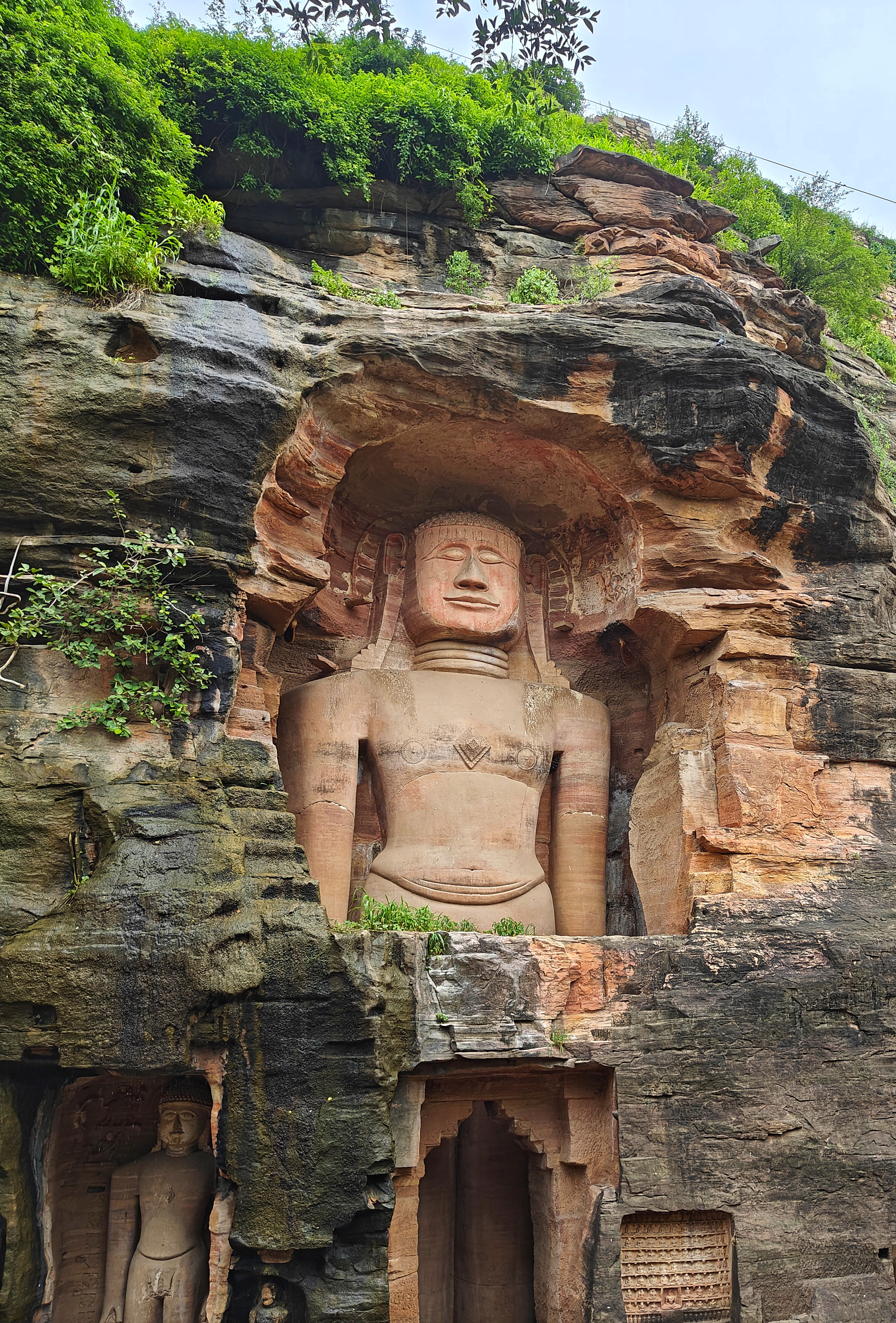
58.4 feet (17.8 m) Rishabhanatha, Gopachal rock cut monuments

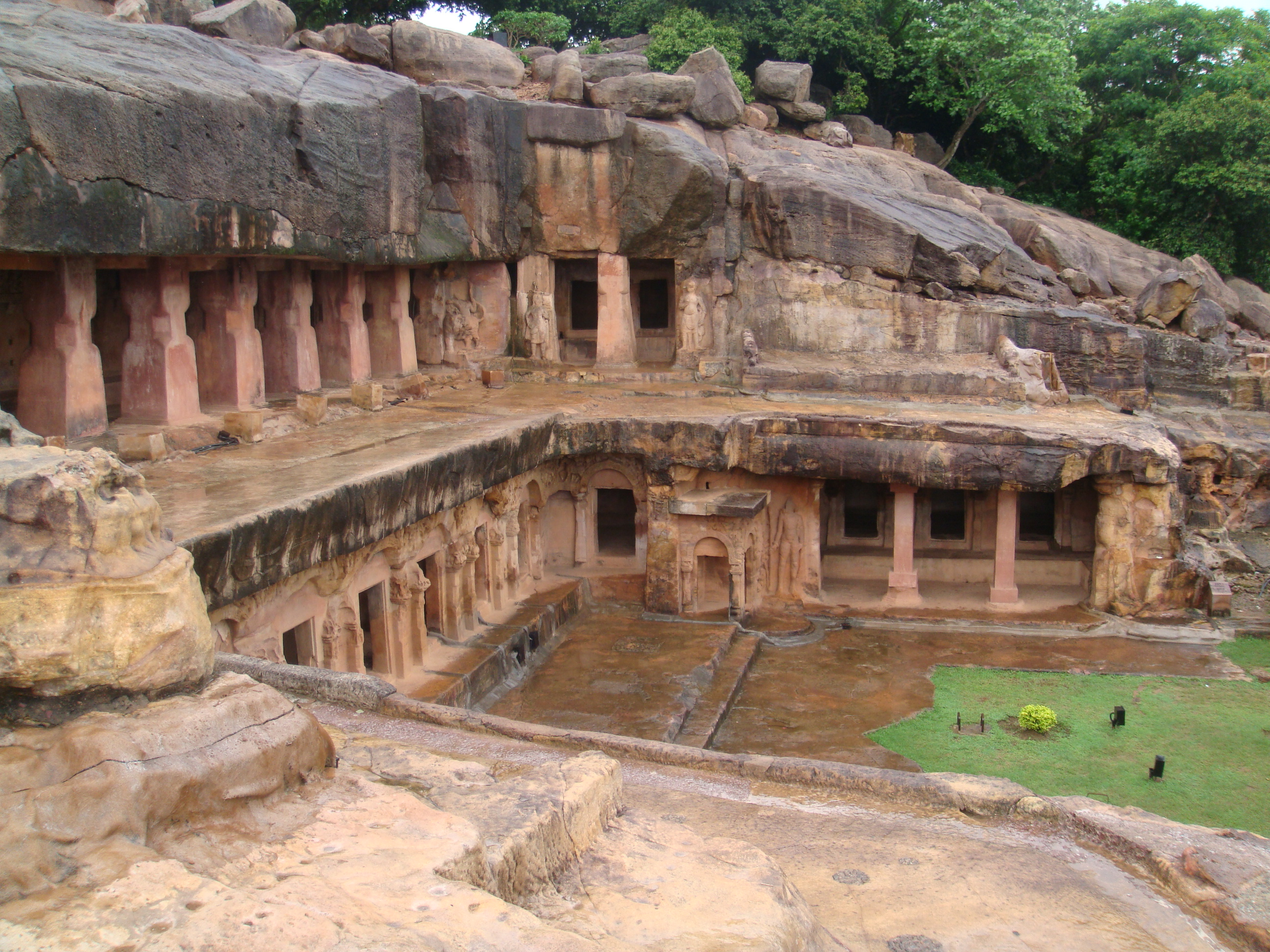
Jain cave monastery in Udayagiri and Khandagiri Caves (2nd century BCE)

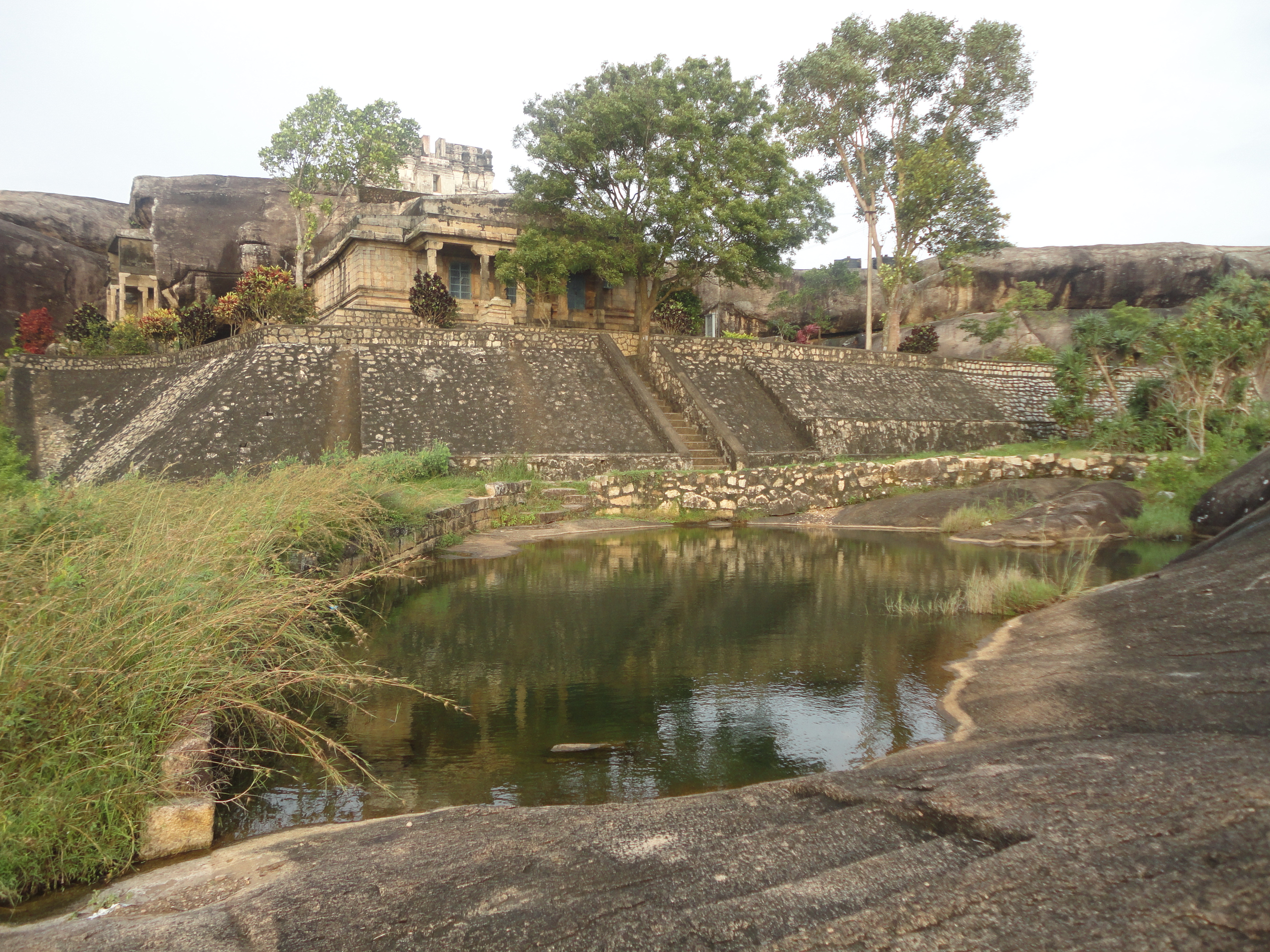
Chitharal Jain Monuments, 1st century BCE

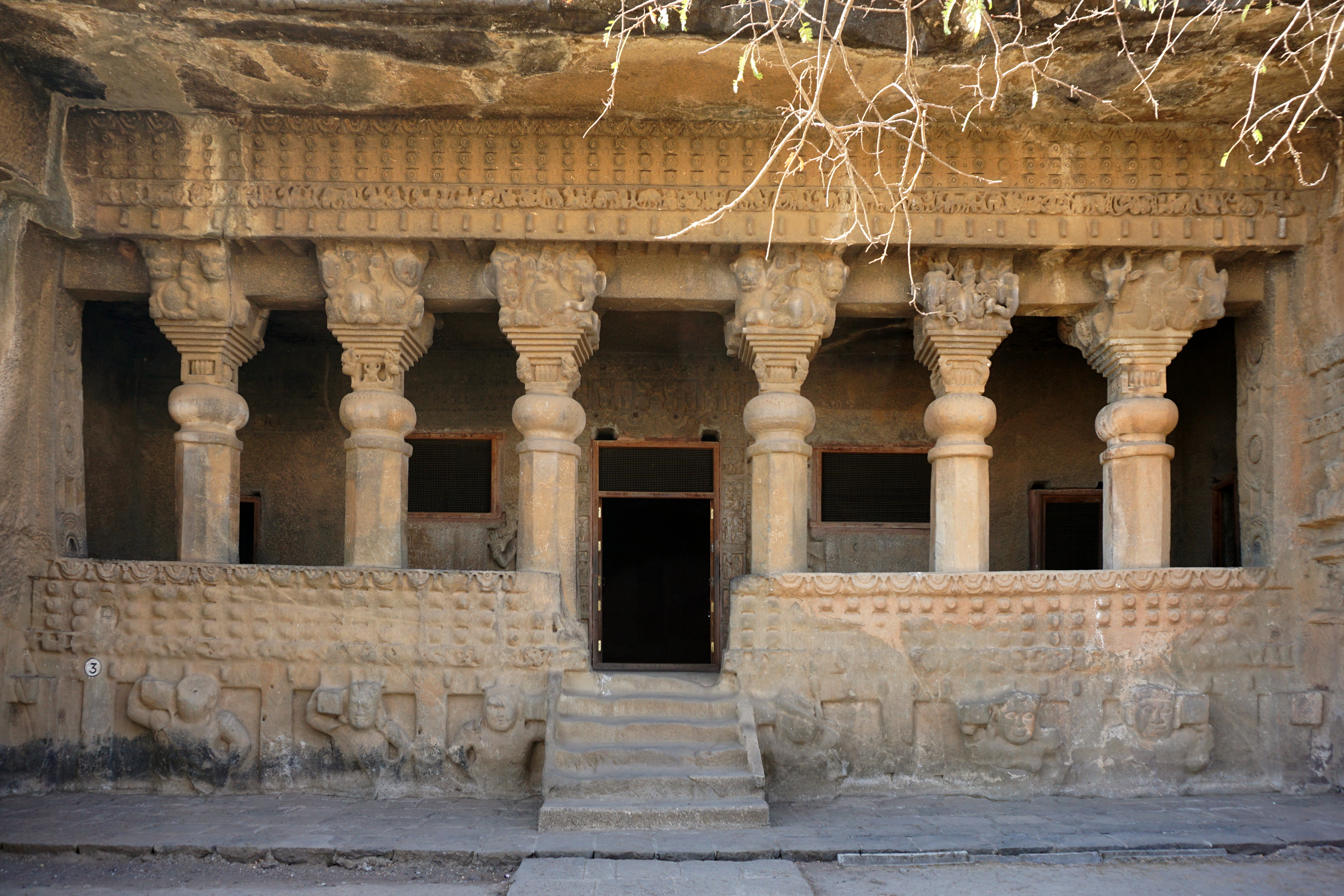
Gautamiputra vihara at Pandavleni Caves, built in the 2nd century CE by the Satavahana dynasty

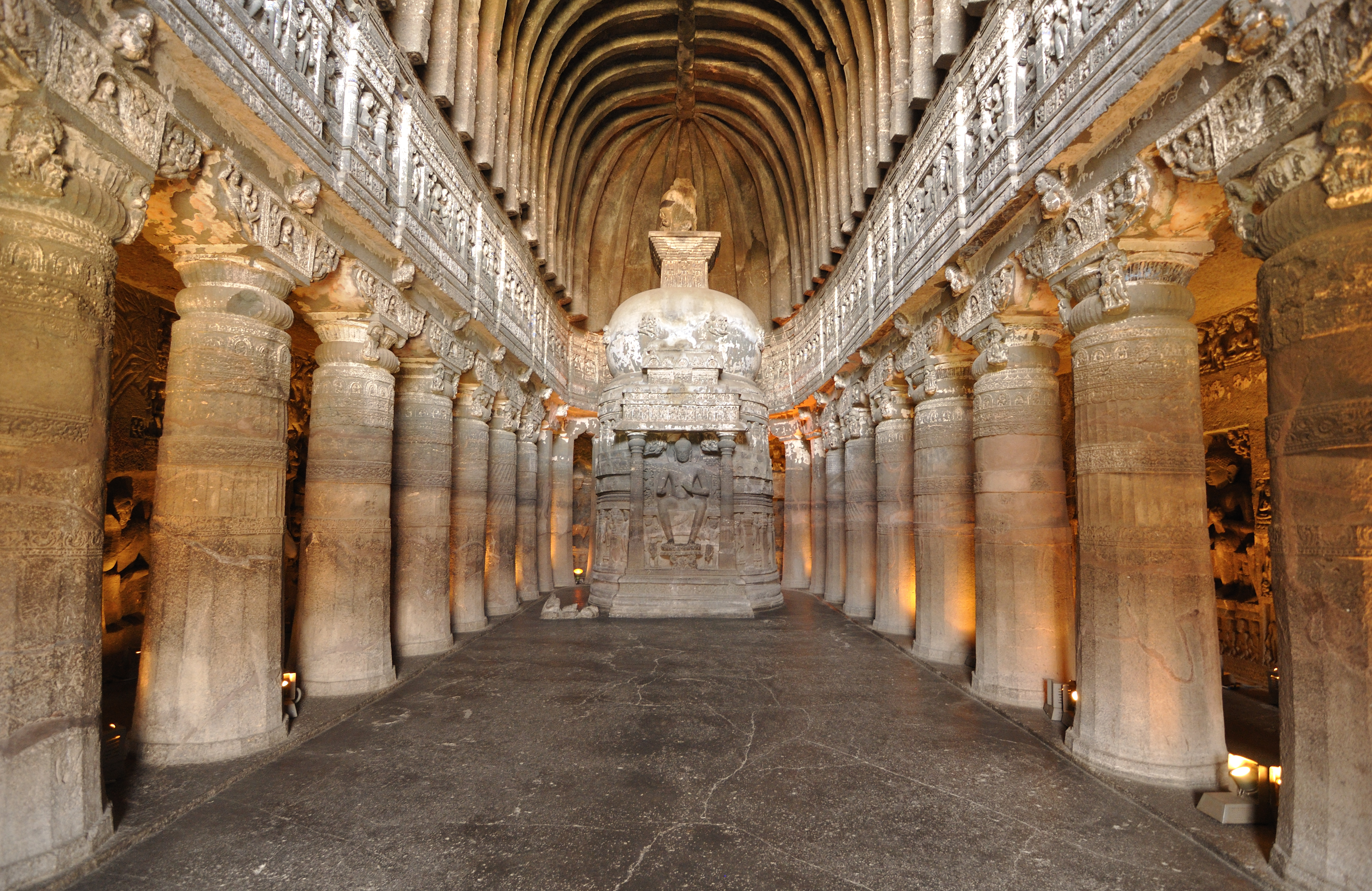
The Ajanta Caves are 30 rock-cut Buddhist cave monument built under the Vakatakas, c. 5th century CE.

=== Decorated stupas ===
Stupas were soon to be richly decorated with sculptural reliefs, following the first attempts at Sanchi Stupa No.2 (125 BCE). Full-fledged sculptural decorations and scenes of the life of the Buddha would soon follow at Bharhut (115 BCE), Bodh Gaya (60 BCE), Mathura (125–60 BCE), again at Sanchi for the elevation of the toranas (1st century BCE/CE) and then Amaravati (1st–2nd century CE).

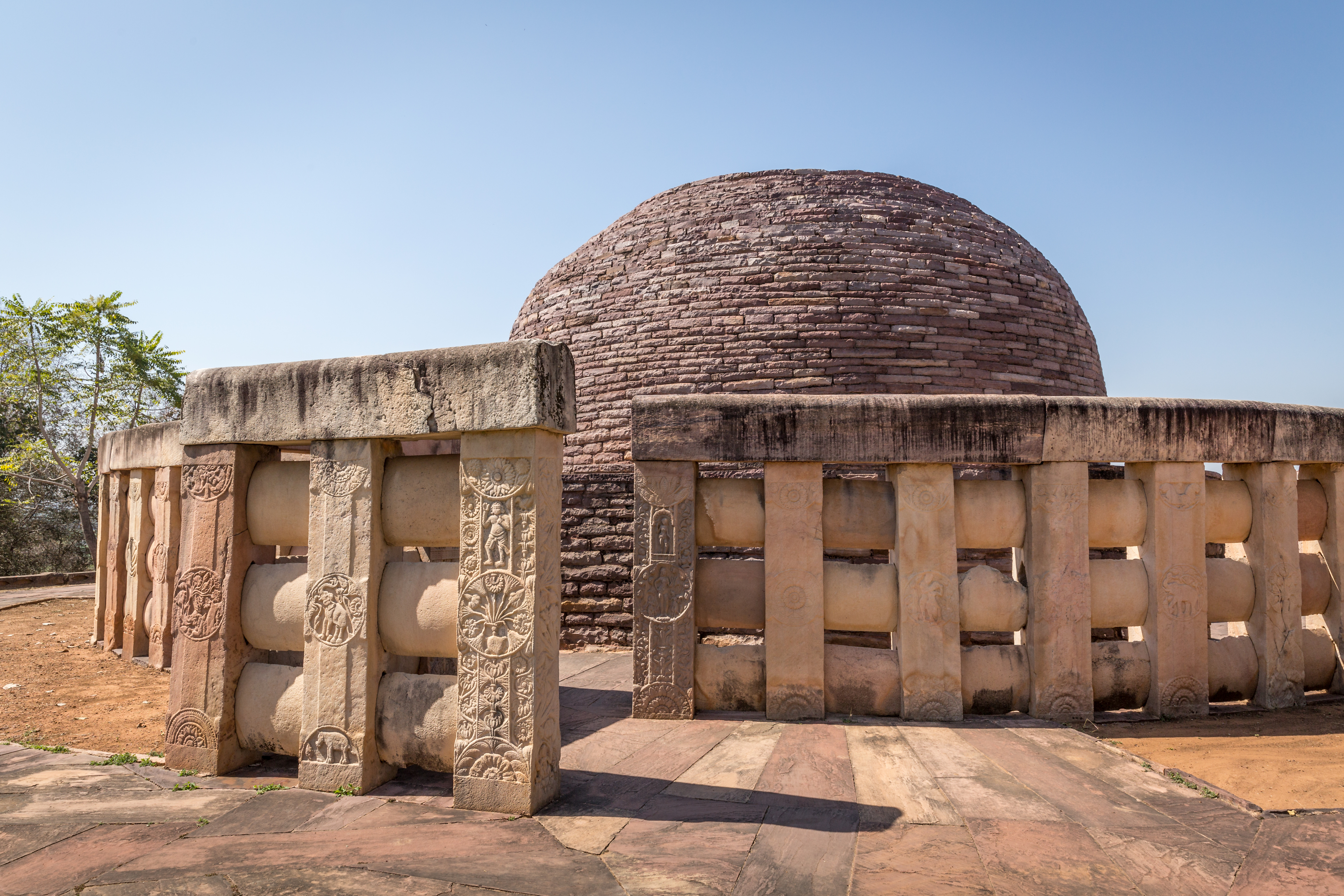
Sanchi Stupa No.2, the earliest known stupa with important displays of decorative reliefs, c. 125 BCE

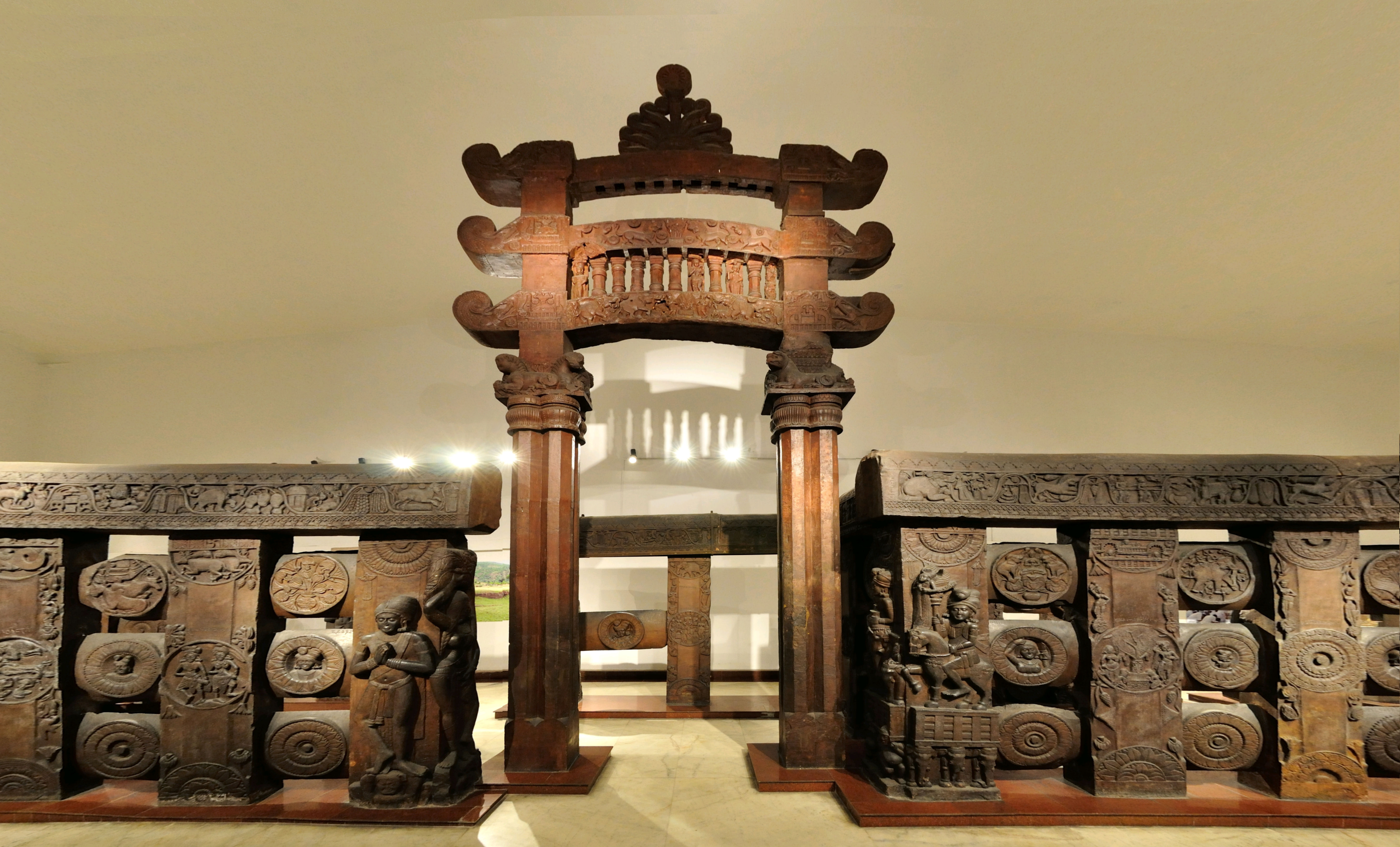
East Gateway and Railings of Bharhut Stupa. Sculptured railings: 115 BCE, toranas: 75 BCE.

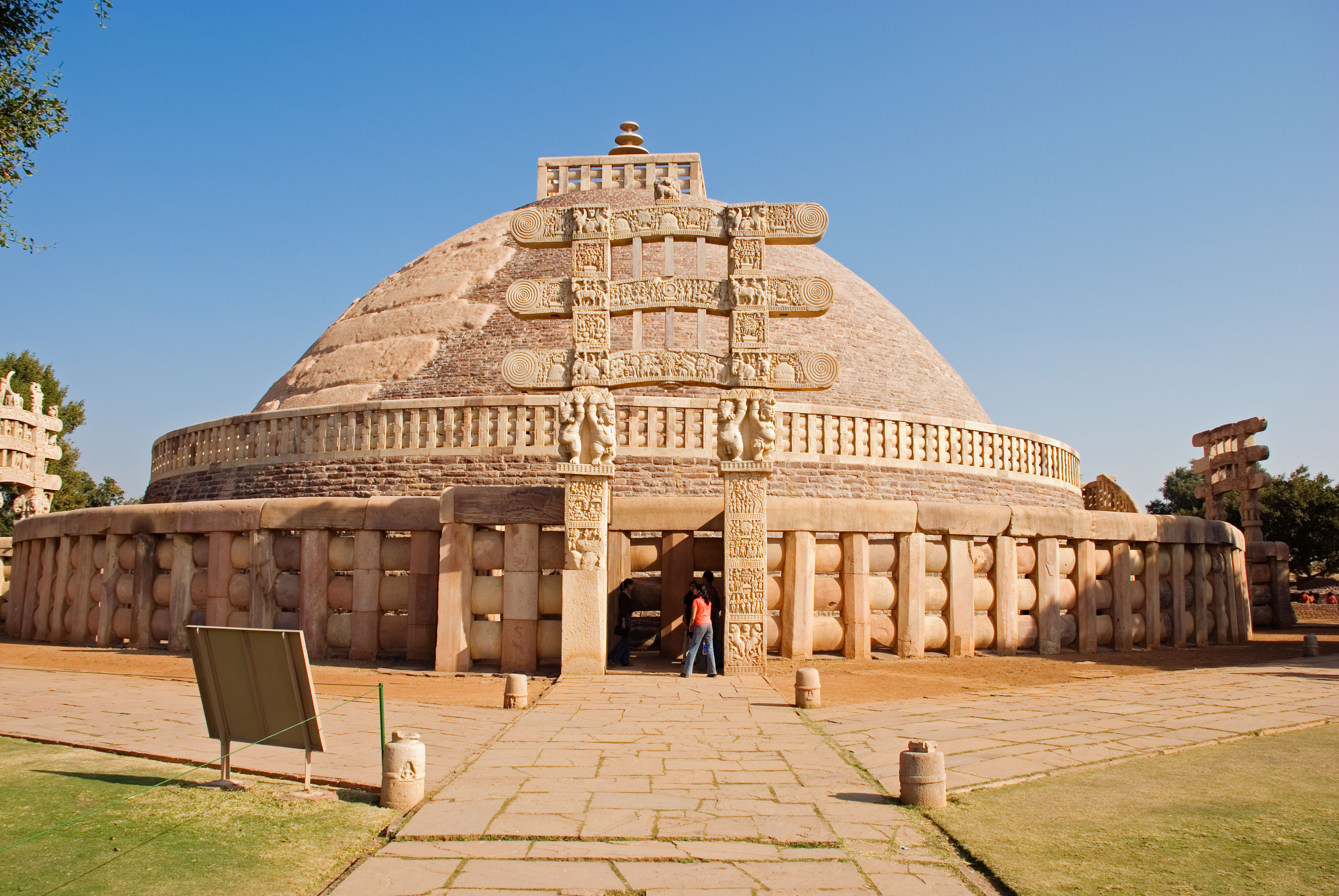
The Great Stupa at Sanchi. Decorated toranas built from the 1st century BCE to the 1st century CE.

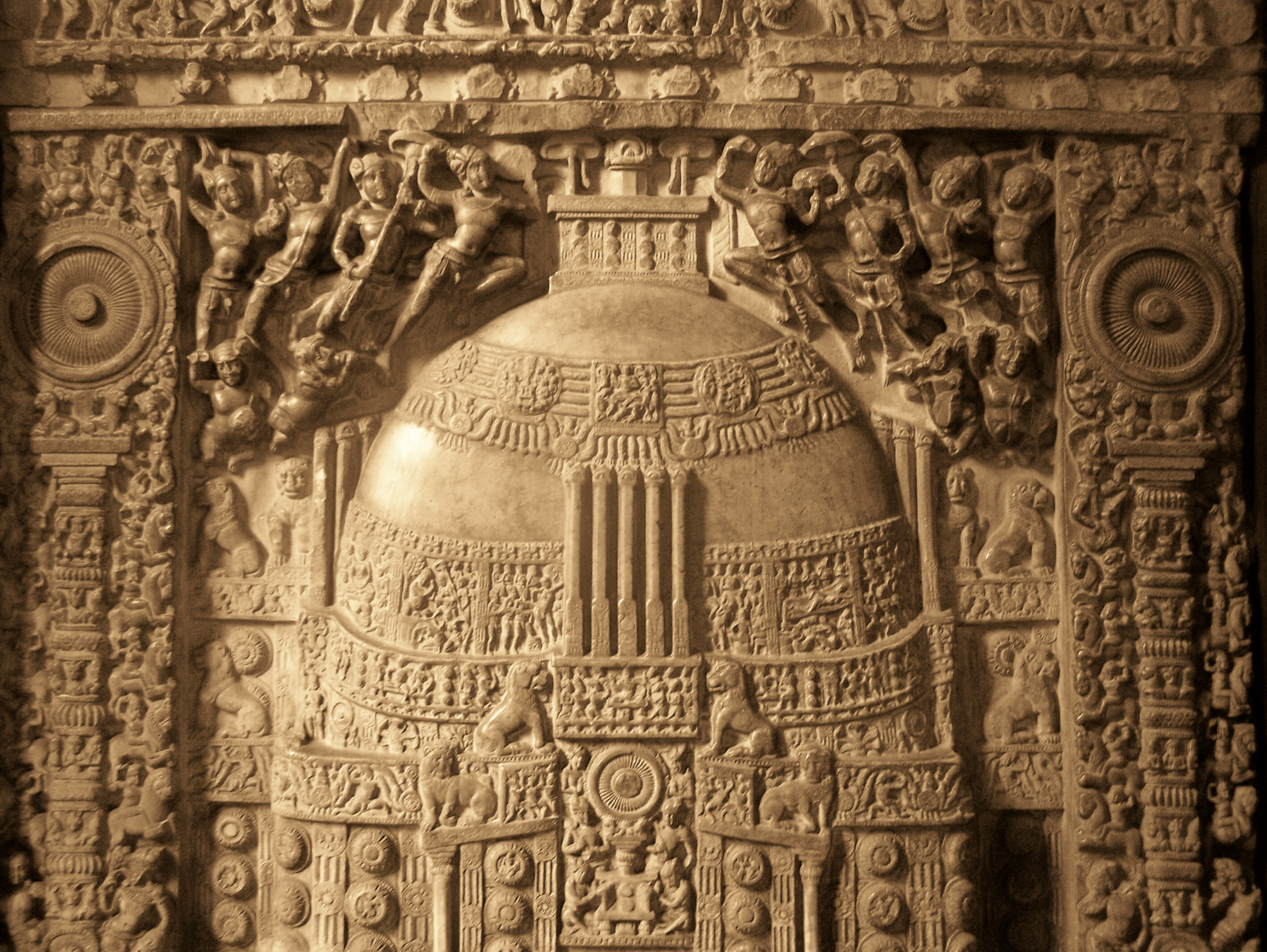
Slab of Amaravati Marbles, depicting of the Great Amaravati Stupa, with a Buddha statue at the entrance, Amaravathi, Andhra Pradesh, India

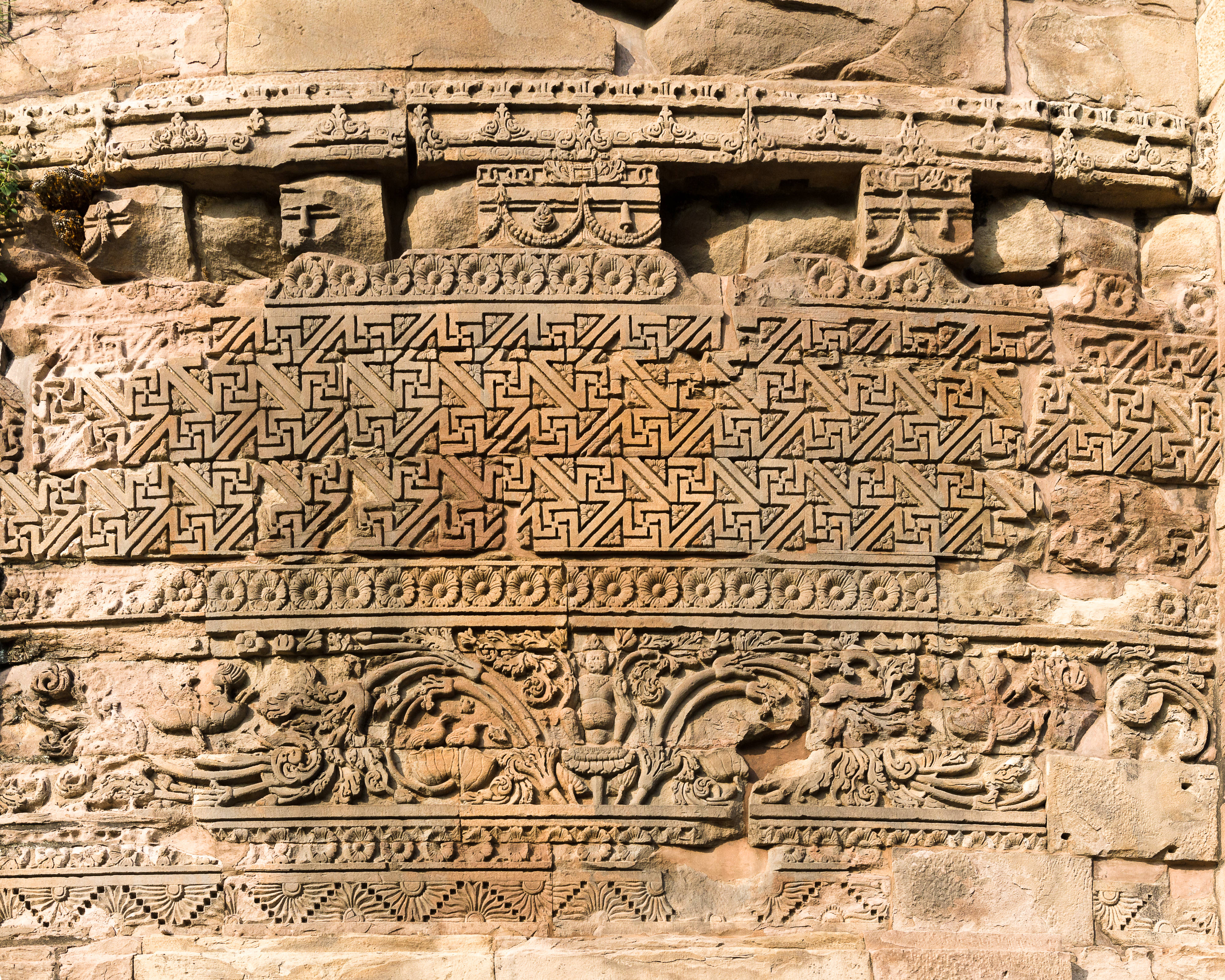
Geometrical decorations, Dhamekh Stupa, 500 CE

=== Stand-alone temples ===
Domed Buddhist temple, 1st-2nd century CE

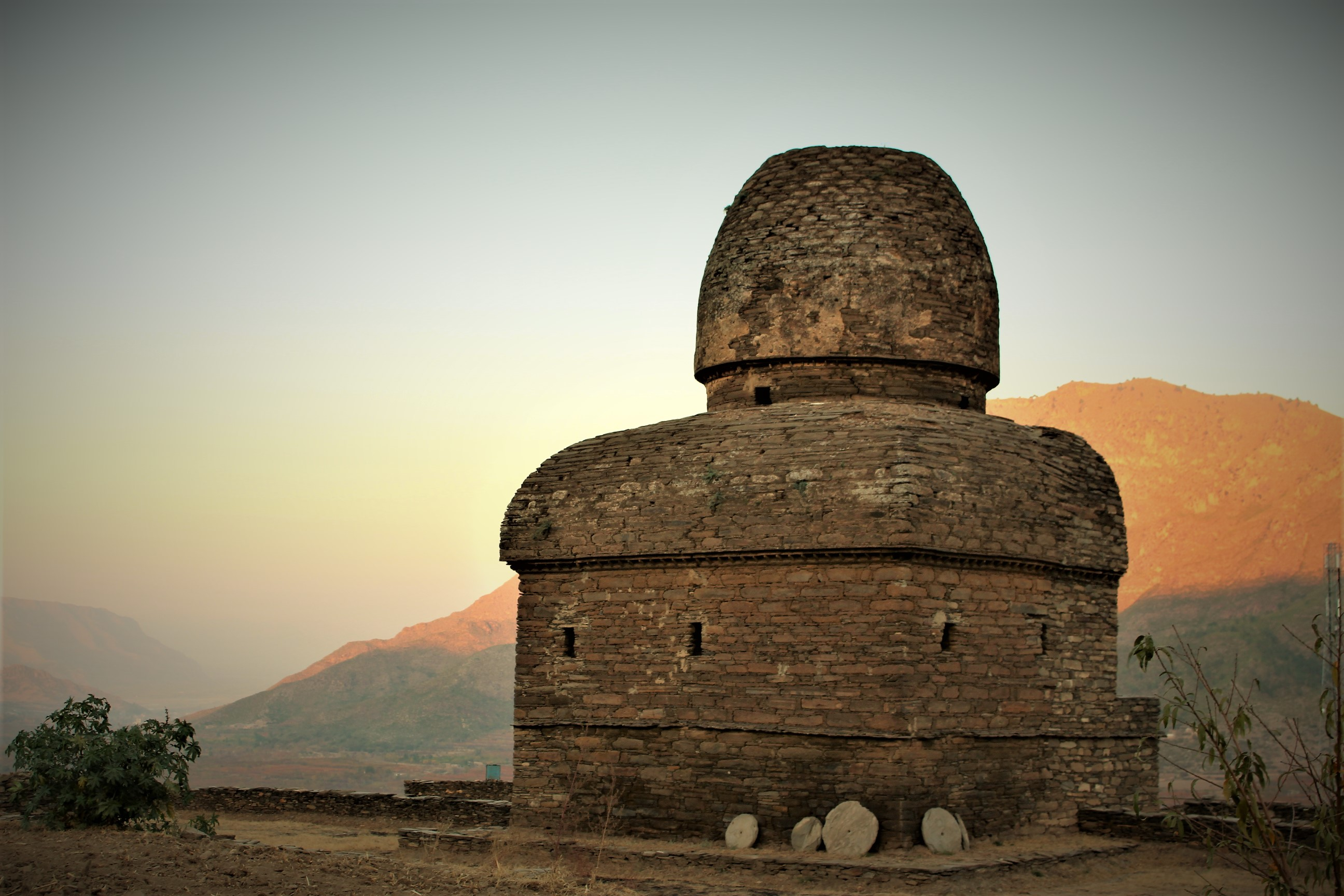
Gumbatona Vihara, Gandhara, 1st-2nd century CE

Temples—built on elliptical, circular, quadrilateral, or apsidal plans—were initially constructed using brick and timber. Some temples of timber with wattle-and-daub may have preceded them, but none remain to this day.

==== Circular dome temples ====
Some of the earliest free-standing temples may have been of a circular type, as the Bairat Temple in Bairat, Rajasthan, formed of a central stupa surrounded by a circular colonnade and an enclosing wall. It was built during the time of Ashoka, and near it were found two of Ashoka's Minor Rock Edicts. Ashoka also built the Mahabodhi Temple in Bodh Gaya c. 250 BCE, also a circular structure, in order to protect the Bodhi Tree under which the Buddha had found enlightenment.

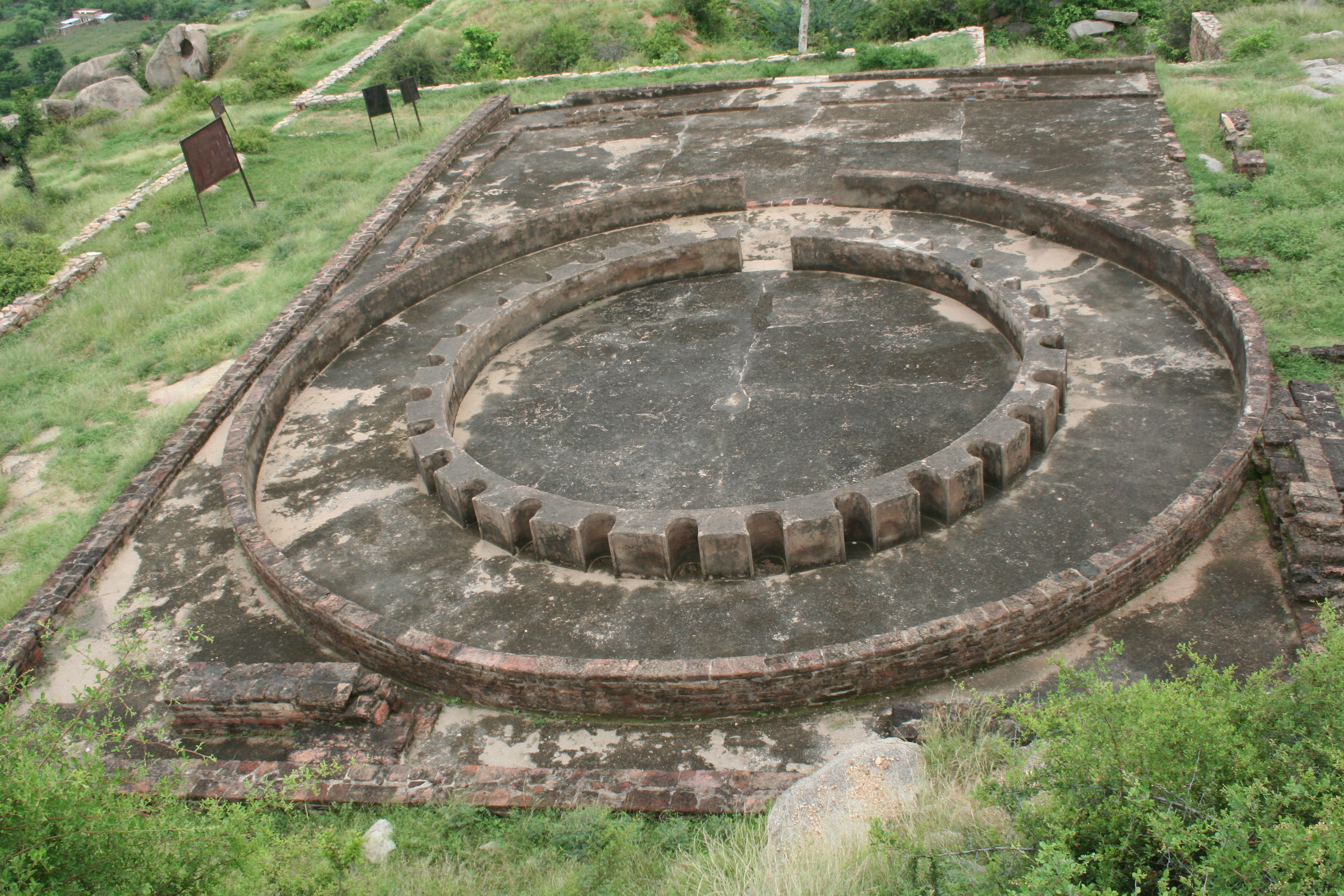
Remains of the circular Bairat Temple, c. 250 BCE. A stupa was located in the center.

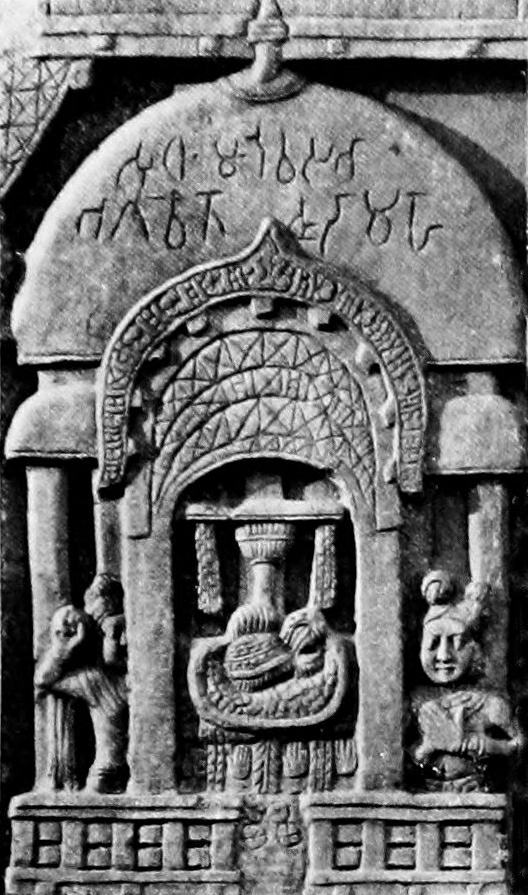
Relief of a circular temple, Bharhut, c. 100 BCE

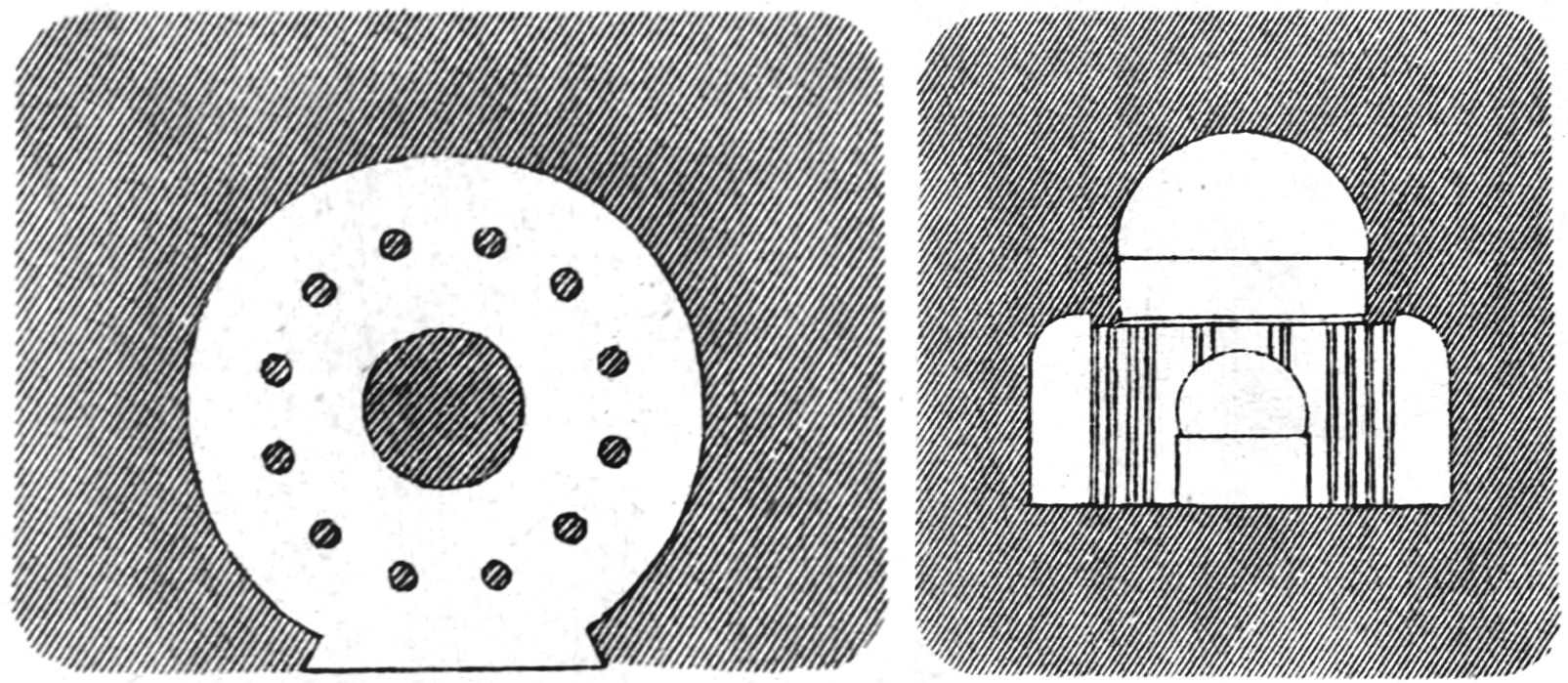
Chaitya Cave plan and elevation, Tulja Lena, 50 BCE

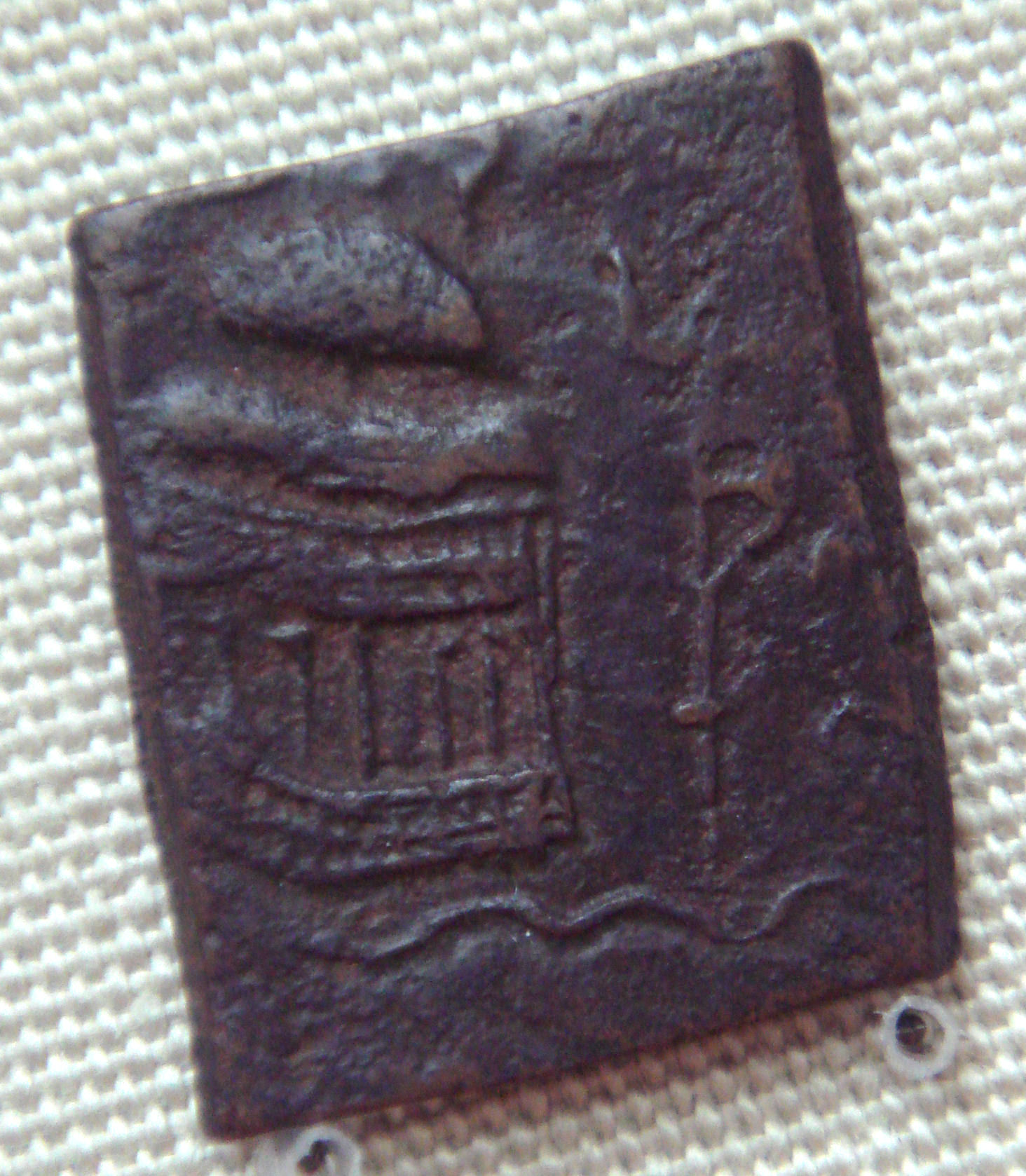
Hindu temple dedicated to Shiva depicted in a coin from the 1st century BCE

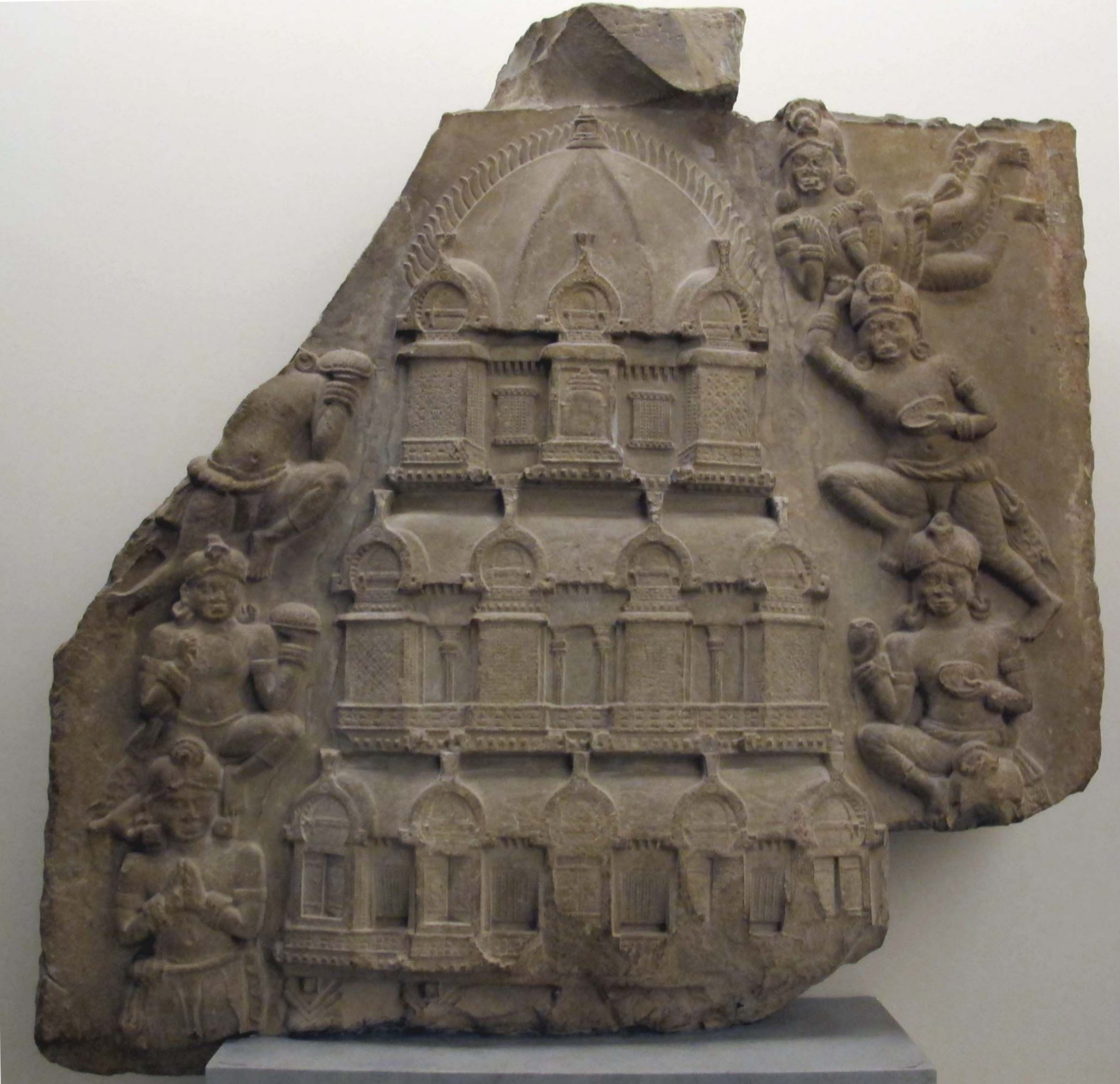
Relief of a multi-storied temple, 2nd century CE, Ghantasala Stupa

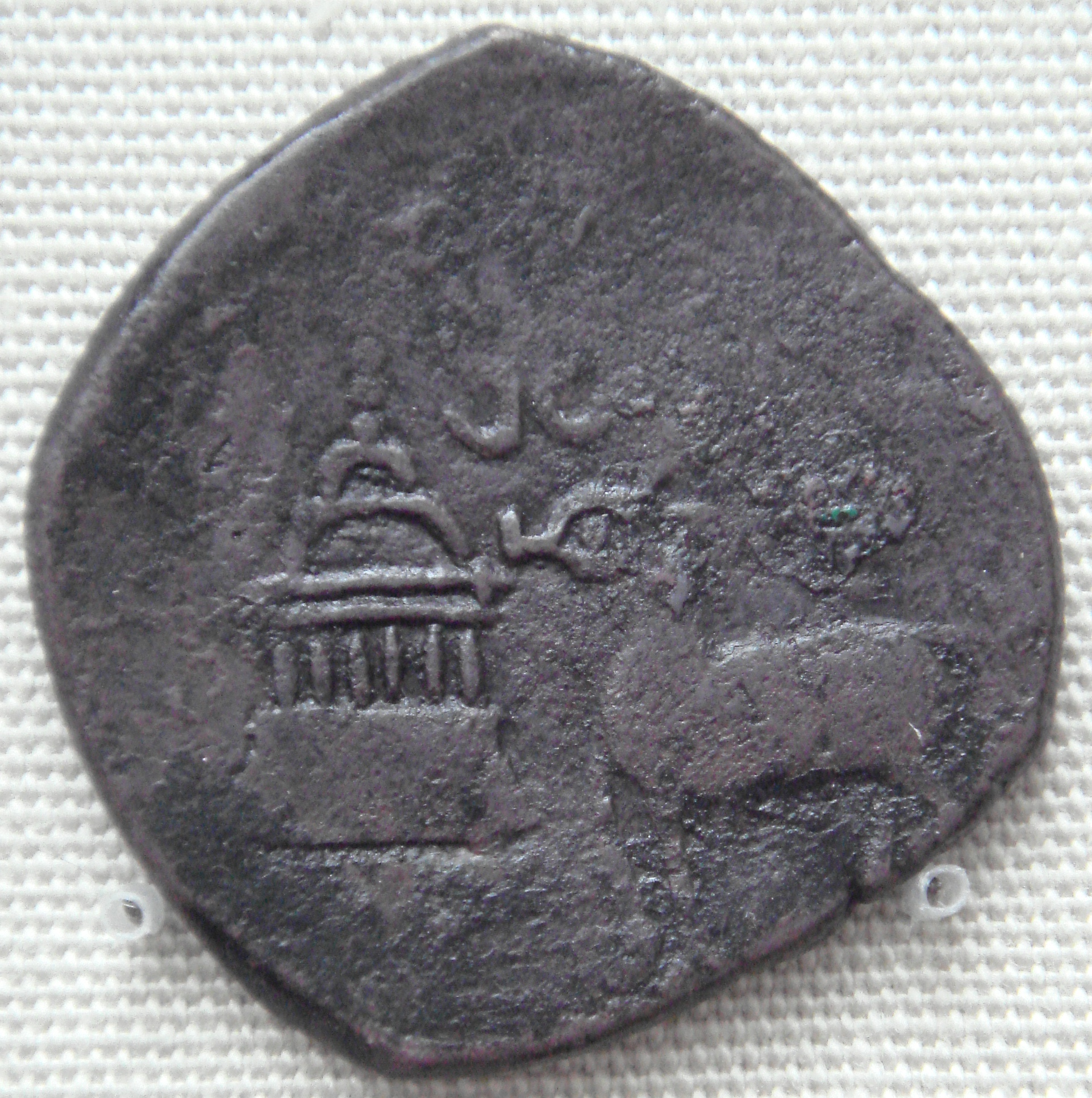
Karttikeya Shrine with antelope in a coin of Yaudheya, Haryana, 2nd century CE

==== Apsidal temples ====
Another early free-standing temple in India, this time apsidal in shape, appears to be Temple 40 at Sanchi, which is also dated to the 3rd century BCE. It was an apsidal temple built of timber on top of a high rectangular stone platform, 26.52x14x3.35 metres, with two flights of stairs to the east and the west. A freestanding apsidal temple remains to this day, although in a modified form, in the Trivikrama Temple in Ter, Maharashtra.

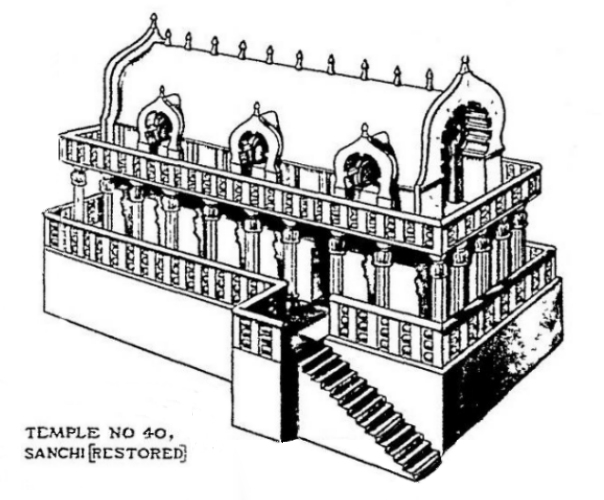
Illustration of Temple 40 at Sanchi, dated to the 3rd century BCE

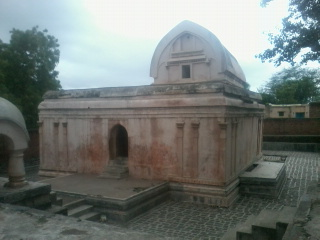
Trivikrama Temple at Ter: an early Buddhist apsidal temple, in front of which was later added a Hindu square mandapa

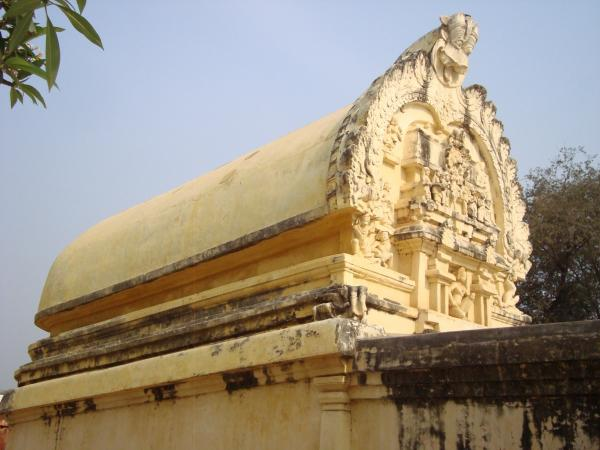
Chejarla apsidal temple, also later converted to Hinduism

==== Truncated pyramidal temples ====
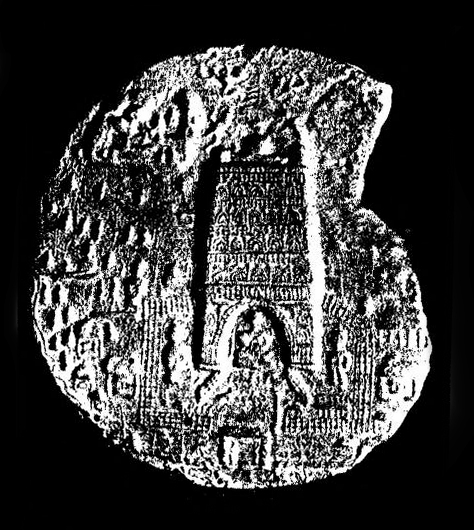
The Mahabodhi Temple in 150–200 CE

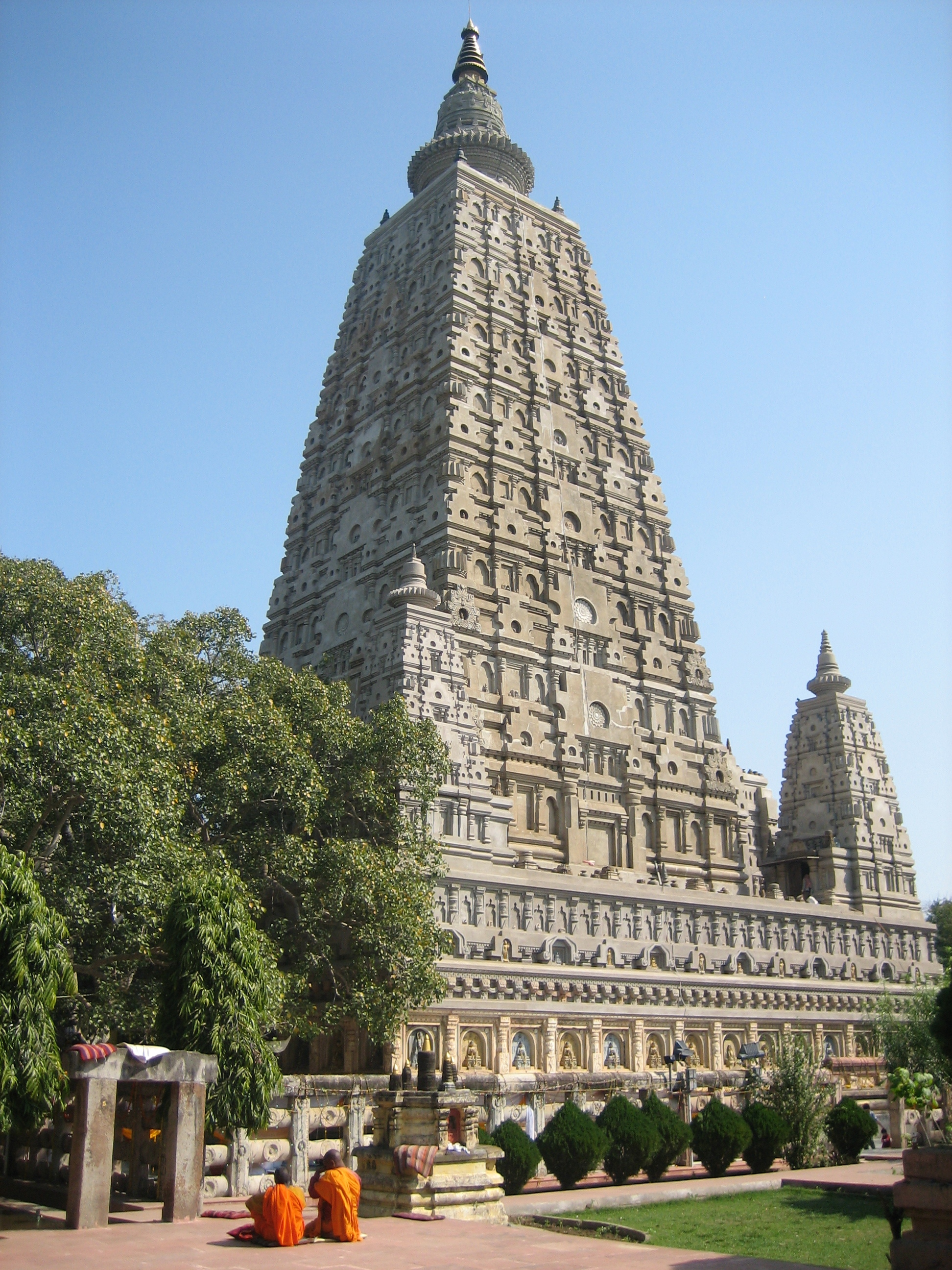
The Mahabodhi Temple: a stepped pyramid with round stupa on top

The Mahabodhi Temple in Bodh Gaya is one of the earliest examples of Truncated Pyramidal temples with niches containing Buddha images. The structure is crowned by the shape of an hemispherical stupa topped by finials, forming a logical elongation of the temple.

This truncated pyramid design also marked the evolution from the aniconic stupa dedicated to the cult of relics, to the iconic temple with multiple images of the Buddha and Bodhisattvas. This design was very influential in the development of later Hindu temples.

==== Square prostyle temples ====
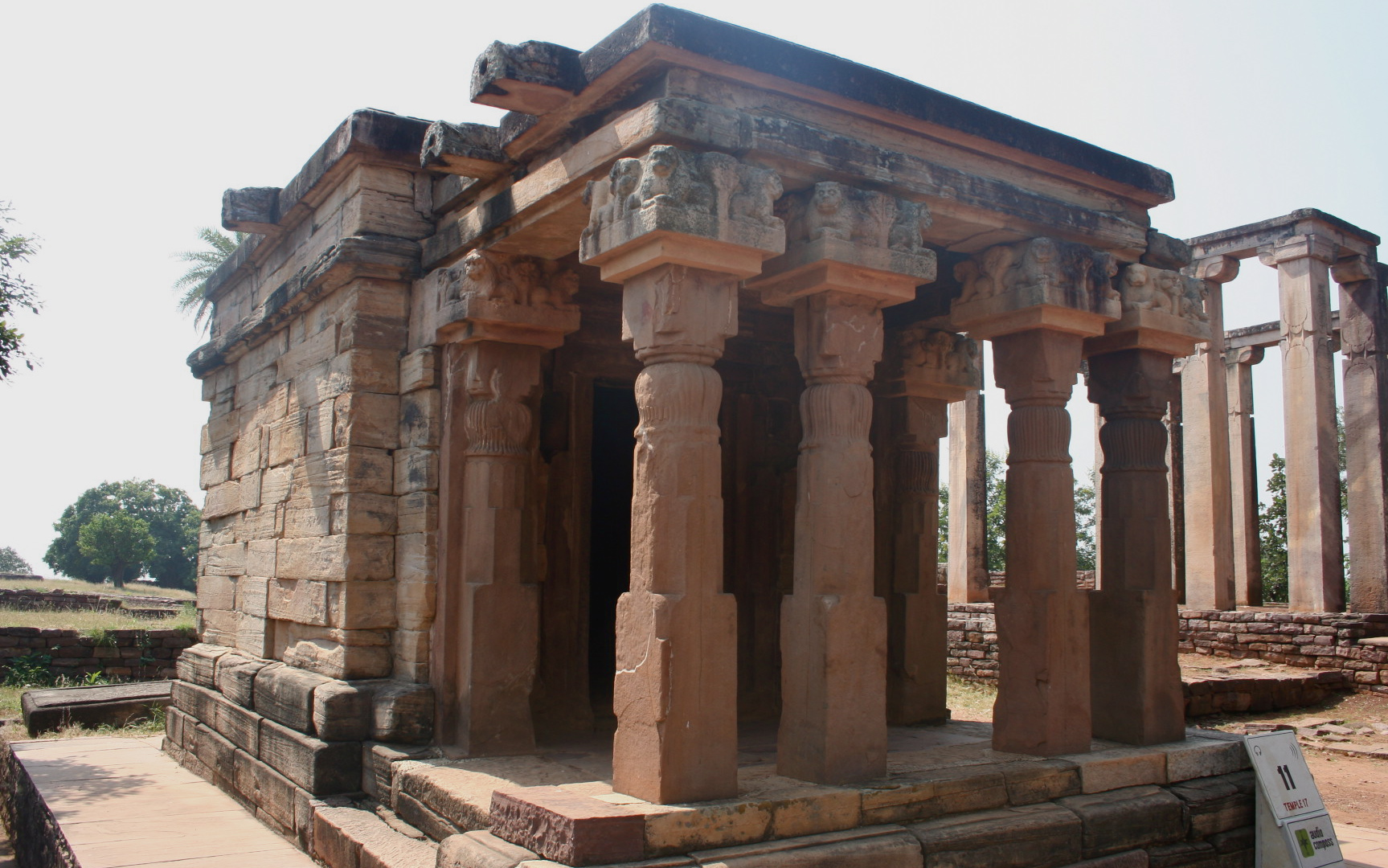
A Gupta period tetrastyle prostyle Buddhist temple of Classical appearance at Sanchi (Temple 17) (5th century CE)

The Gupta Empire later also built Buddhist stand-alone temples (following the great cave temples of Indian rock-cut architecture), such as Temple 17 at Sanchi, dating to the early Gupta period (5th century CE). It consists of a flat roofed square sanctum with a portico and four pillars. From an architectural perspective, this is a tetrastyle prostyle temple of Classical appearance. Pataini temple located near Unchehara, constructed during the reign of Gupta Empire, also features flat roofed square sanctum.

=== Palatial architecture ===
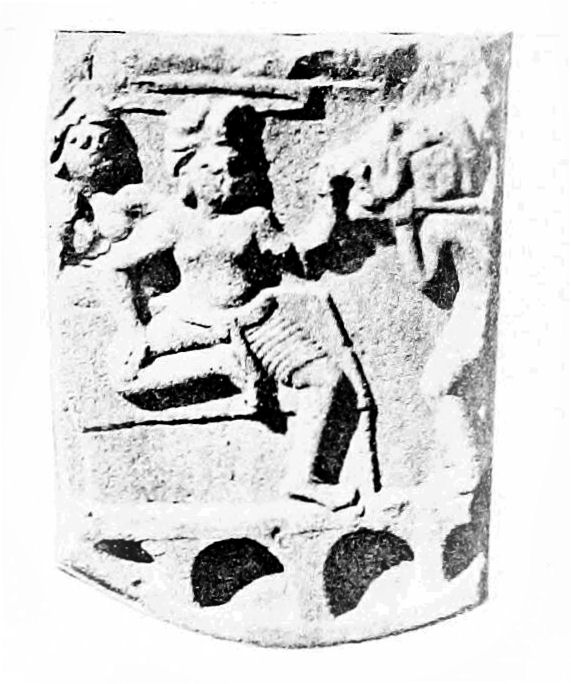
An Indian palace depiction in Mahabodhi railing, showing vaulted underground chambers called suranga, as described by Kautiliya in Arthashastra; Shunga period, 2nd–1st BCE

Archaeological excavation conducted by Archaeological Survey of India (ASI) at Kausambi revealed a palace with its foundations going back to 8th century BCE until 2nd century CE; and built-in six phases. The last phase dated to 1st – 2nd century CE, featured an extensive structure which was divided into three blocks and enclosed two galleries. There was a central hall in the central block and presumably used as an audience hall surrounded by rooms which served as a residential place for the ruler. The entire structure was constructed using bricks and stones and two layers of lime were plastered on it. The palace had a vast network of underground chambers also called Suranga by Kautilya in his Arthashastra, and the superstructure and the galleries were made on the principle of true arch. The four-centered pointed arch was used to span narrow passageways and segmental arch for wider areas. The superstructure of the central and eastern block was examined to have formed part of a dome that adorned the building. The entire galleries and superstructure were found collapsed under 5 cm thick layer of ash which indicates destruction of the palace through conflagration.

Rulers would often use their palaces to symbolize their majesty and greatness. Aligning with the belief at the time the monarch had the divine right to rule. This idea is captured in the expression "the king becomes not only exempt from punishment but also the lord of the law"

A palace architecture has also been uncovered at Nagarjunakonda.

=== Shikhara ===
The early evidence of Shikhara type domical crowing structure has been noted in the palatial architecture of Kausambi dated to 1st-2nd century CE. The central hall was thought to be topped by a dome but analysis of the bricks indicate Shikara type structure was used instead. Evidence also indicates Shikhara was also used in crowing architecture such as Bhitargaon temple.

=== Theater and stadium ===
Satavahanas constructed a stadium and a theater at Nagarjunakonda in the 2nd century AD. The theater has a small quadrangular open area enclosed on all four sides by stepped stands which are made of bricks and cladded with limestone.

An oblong-shaped stadium dating form the same era consisted of an arena which was enclosed on all four sides by flight of steps, with each step measuring two feet wide, and a pavilion which was situated on the west end. At the top of the arena, there was an eleven feet wide platform. The area of arena was 309 X 259 feet and 15 feet deep. The entire construction was done using burnt brick.

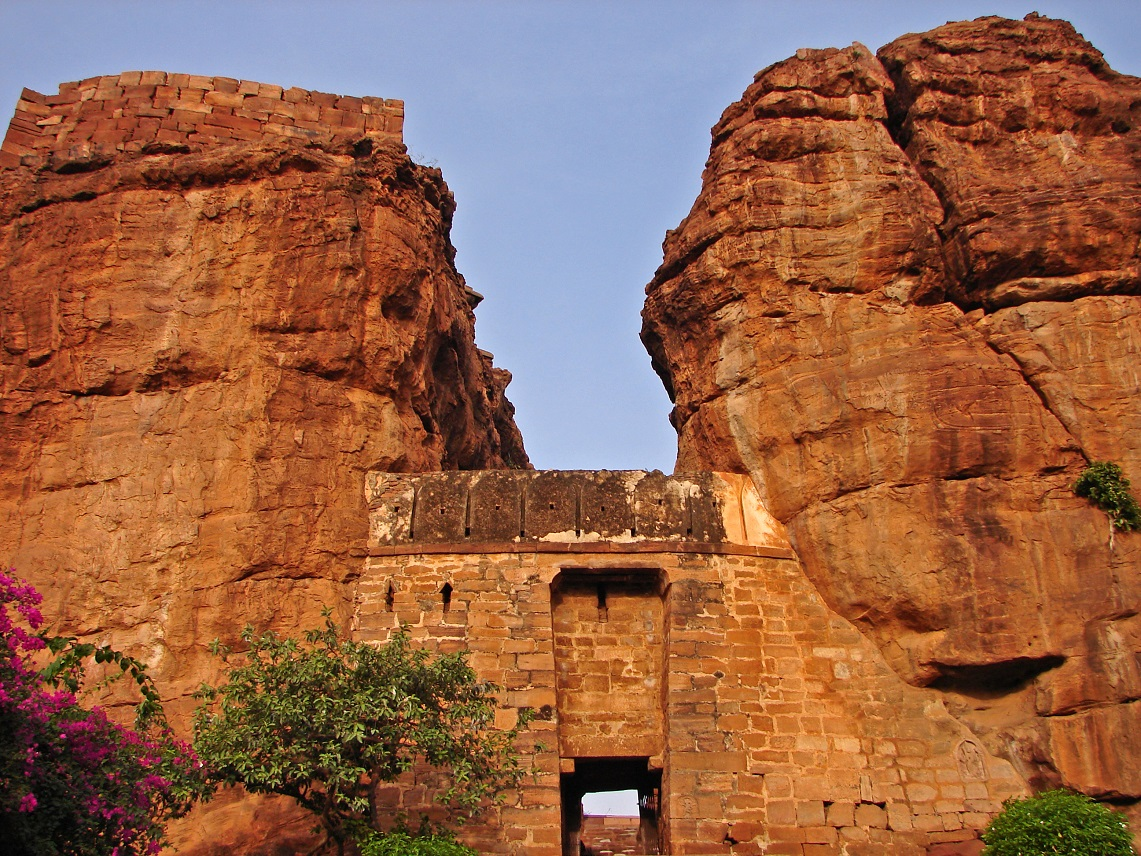
Entrance to the Badami Fort

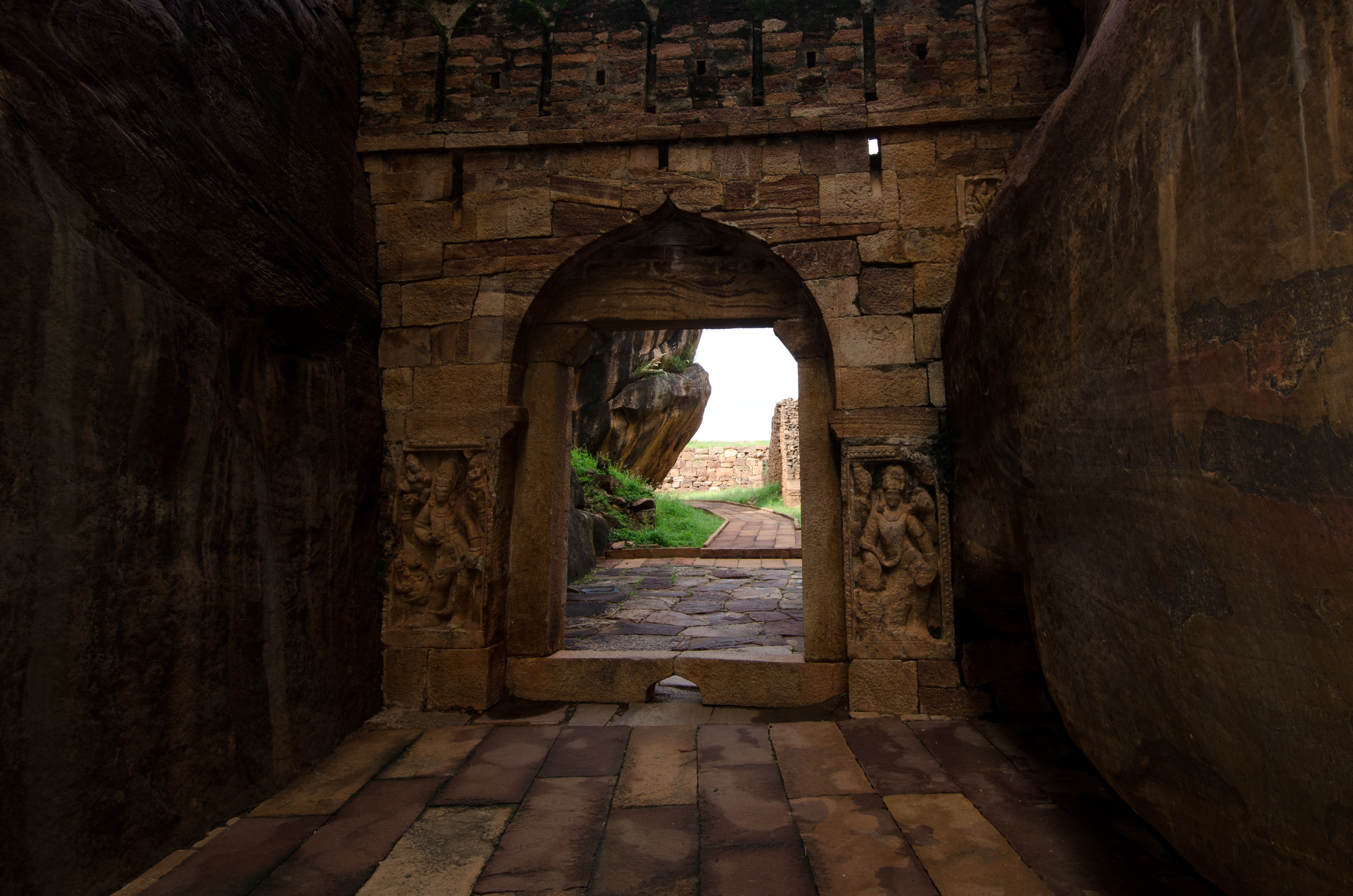
Entrance to the Badami Northern Fort

=== Fortification ===
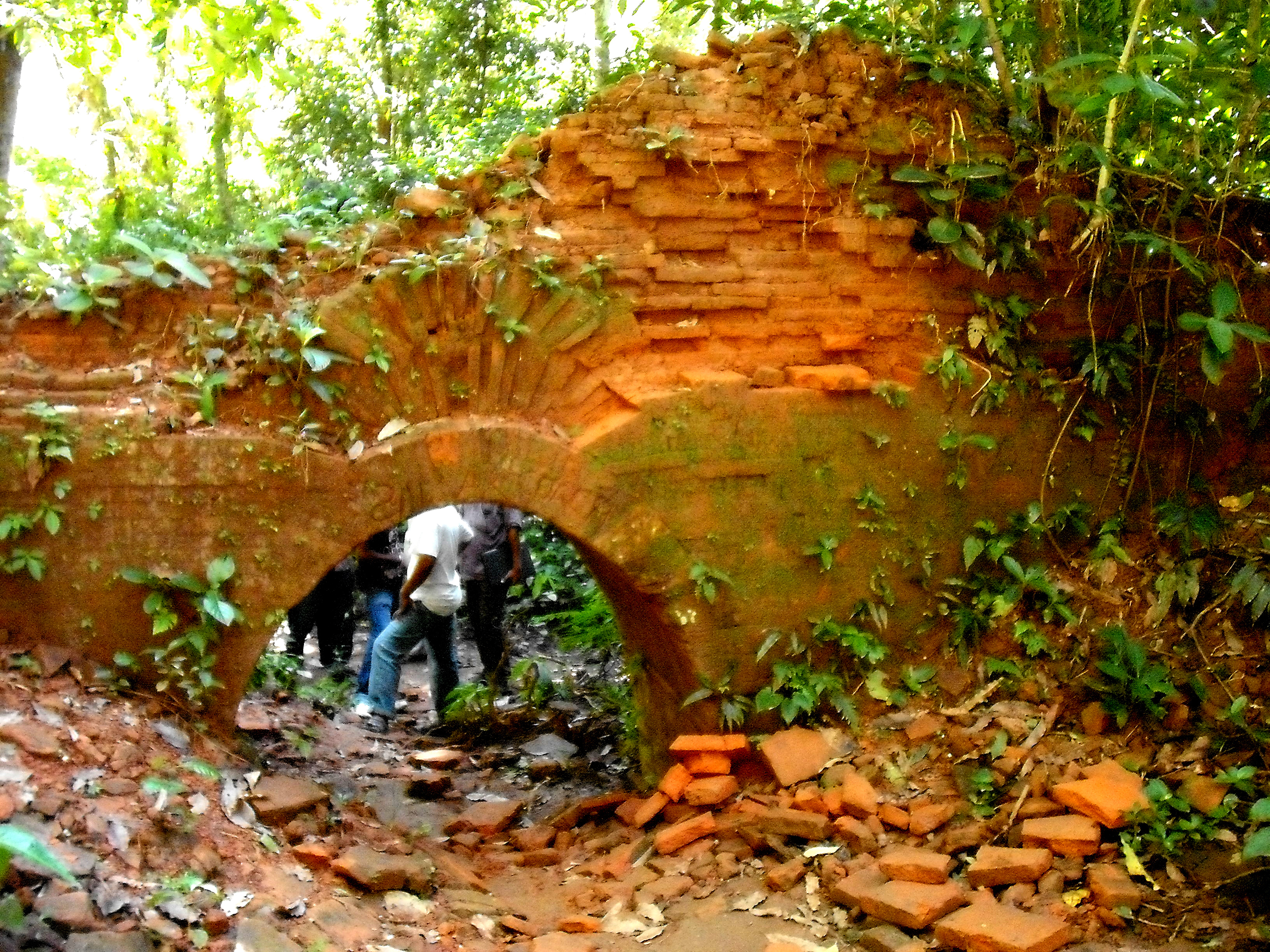
Nalrajar fortification wall, 5th century CE

Nalrajar Garh fortification wall ruins dating back to 5th-century CE. are probably the only standing fortification ruins from Gupta period which are located in a dense jungle in North Bengal near Indo-Bhutan border. A prominent feature of its fortification walls are two parabolic arches. Many fortified cities like Nalrajar Garh, Bhitagarh had risen in Northeastern India owing to trade activities with southeastern China.

Badami or Pulakeshi fort from Chalukya era date back to the 6th century CE.

=== End of the Classical period ===
This period ends with the destructive invasions of the Alchon Huns in the 6th century CE. During the rule of the Hunnic king Mihirakula, over a thousand Buddhist monasteries throughout Gandhara are said to have been destroyed. The Chinese pilgrim Xuanzang, writing in 630 CE, explained that Mihirakula ordered the destruction of Buddhism and the expulsion of monks. He reported that Buddhism had drastically declined, and that most of the monasteries were deserted and left in ruins.

== Early Middle Ages (550–1200 CE) ==
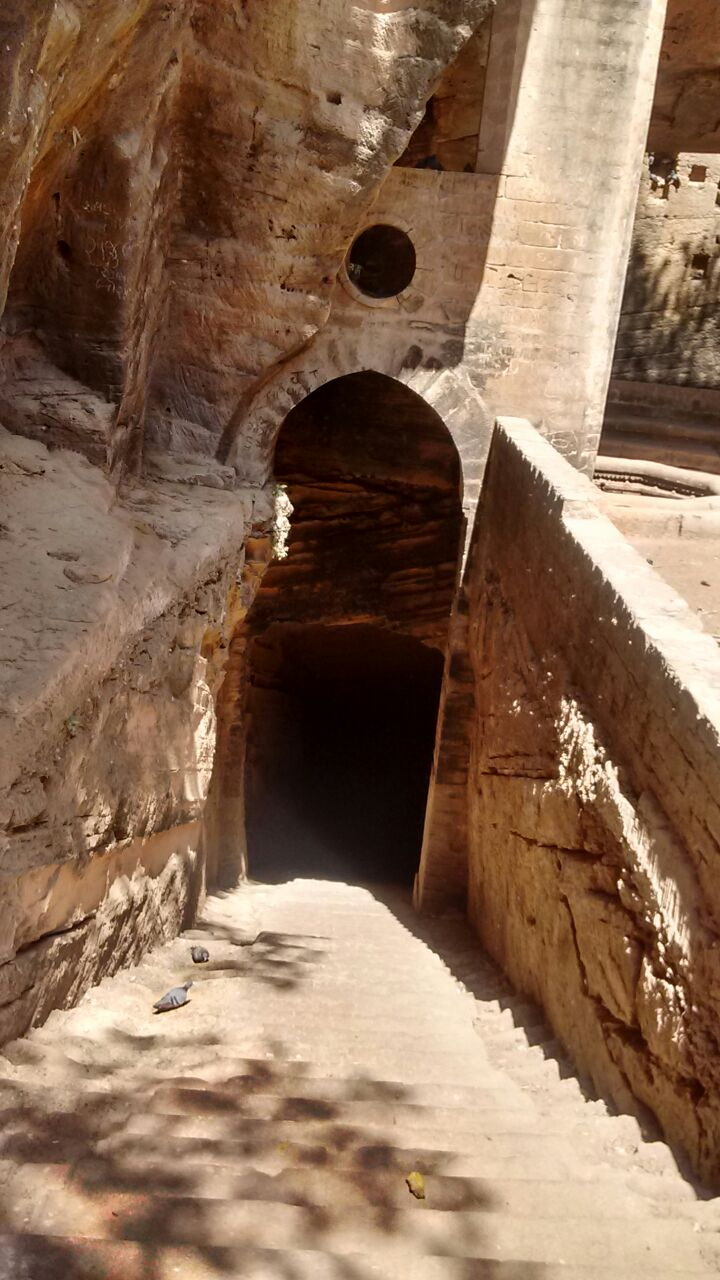
Navghan Kuvo, Gujarat, 11th century CE.

Hindu temple architecture in the Indian subcontinent continued to develop in North India and South India. Nagara style developed in North India where a Hindu temple incorporated Shikhara as its predominant architectural element whereas in southern India Vimana was used instead. The Hindu temple architecture was characterized by the use of stone as the dominant building material compared to the earlier period in which the burnt bricks were used instead.

Regional styles include Architecture of Karnataka, Kalinga architecture, Dravidian architecture, Western Chalukya architecture, and Badami Chalukya Architecture.

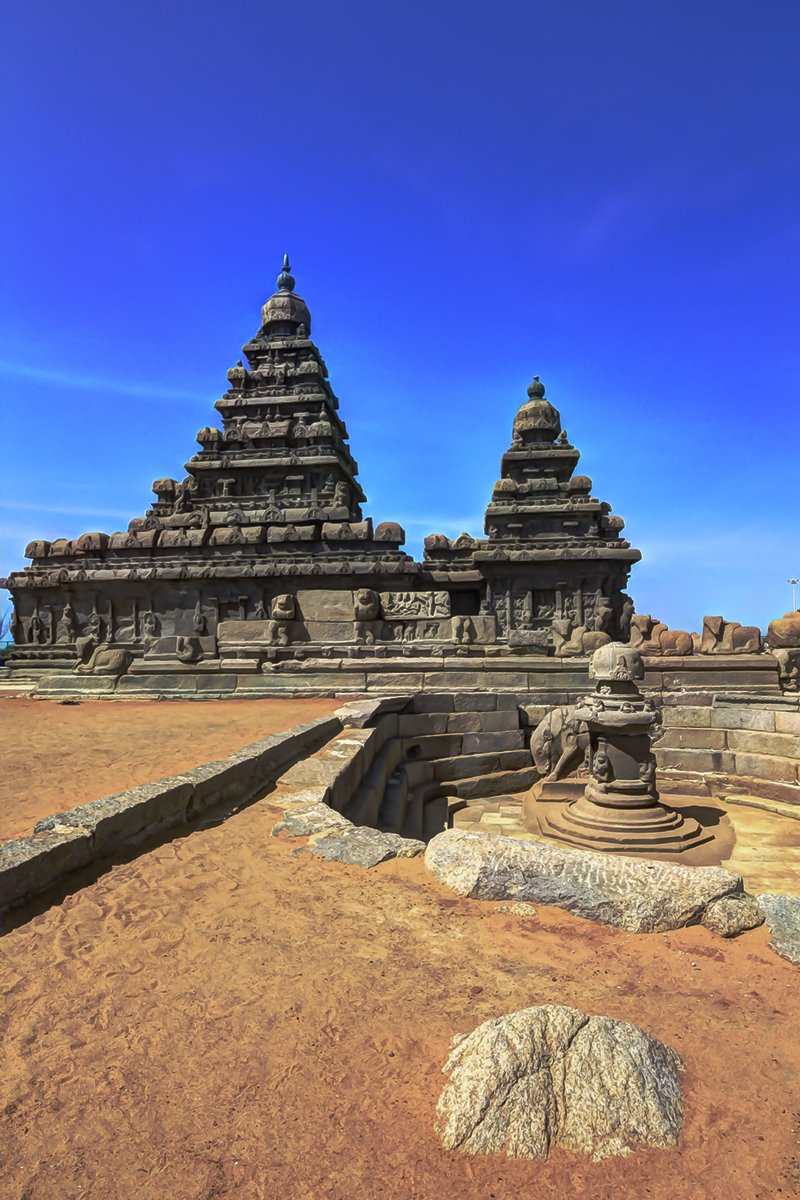
The rock-cut Shore Temple of the temples in Mahabalipuram, 700–728 CE

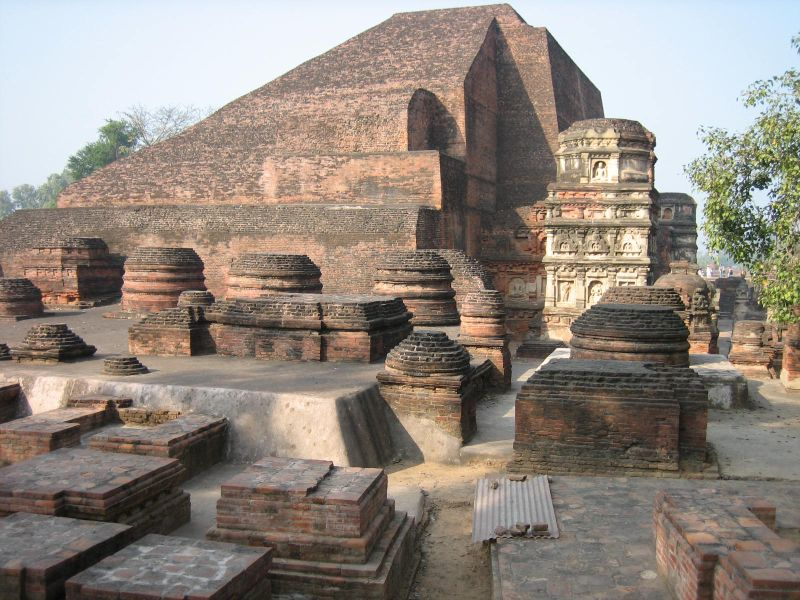
The ruins of Nalanda Mahavihara at Nalanda

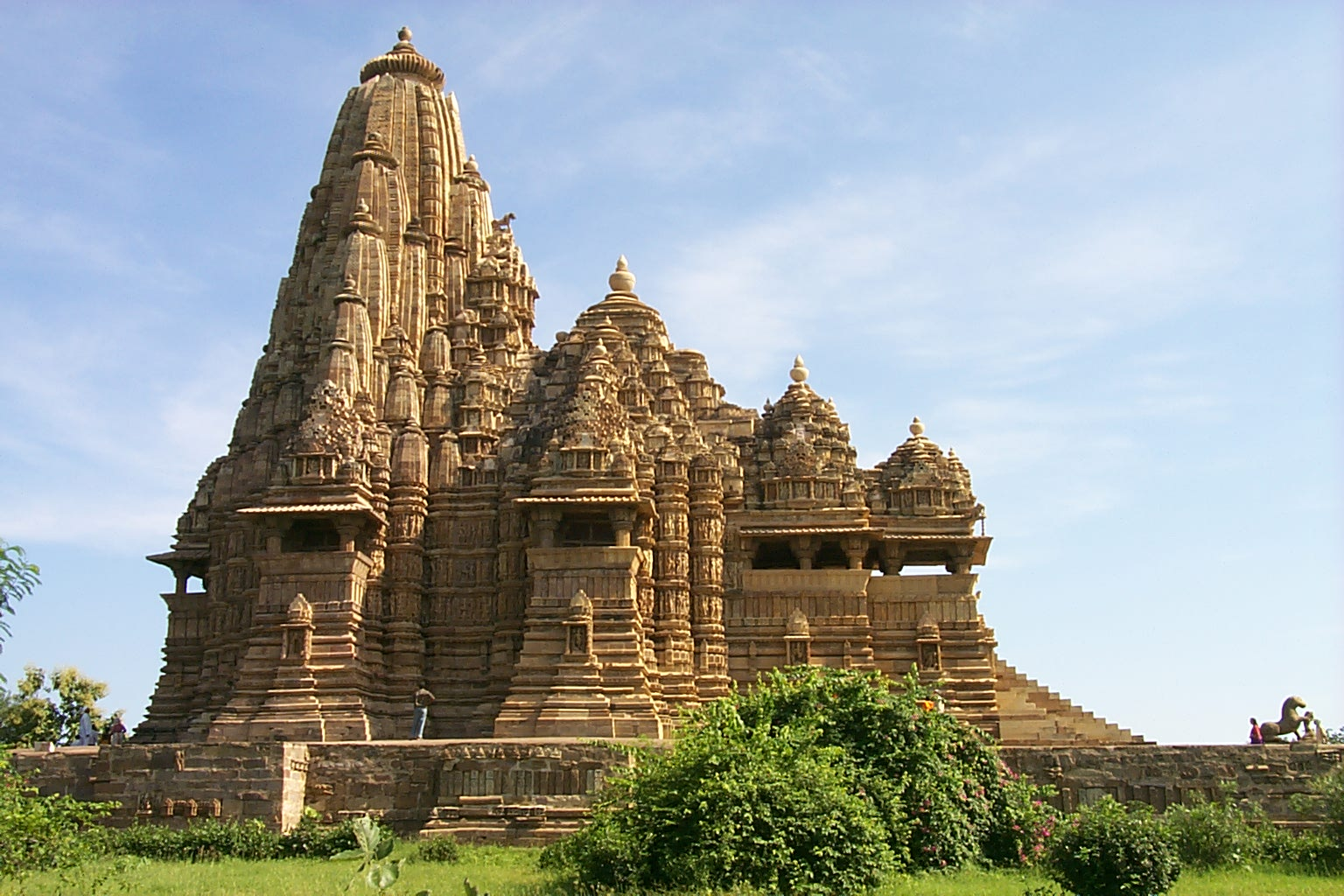
The Kandariya Mahadeva Temple at the Khajuraho Temple Complex in the shikhara style architecture, a UNESCO World Heritage Site

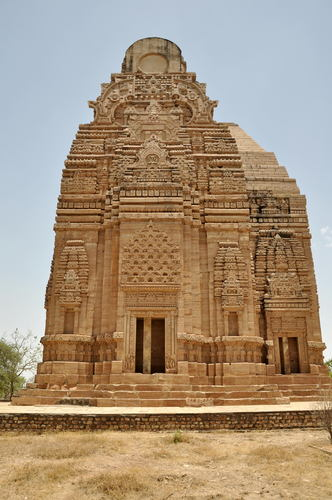
Teli ka Mandir is an 8th/9th century Hindu Temple built by the Pratihara emperor Mihira Bhoja.

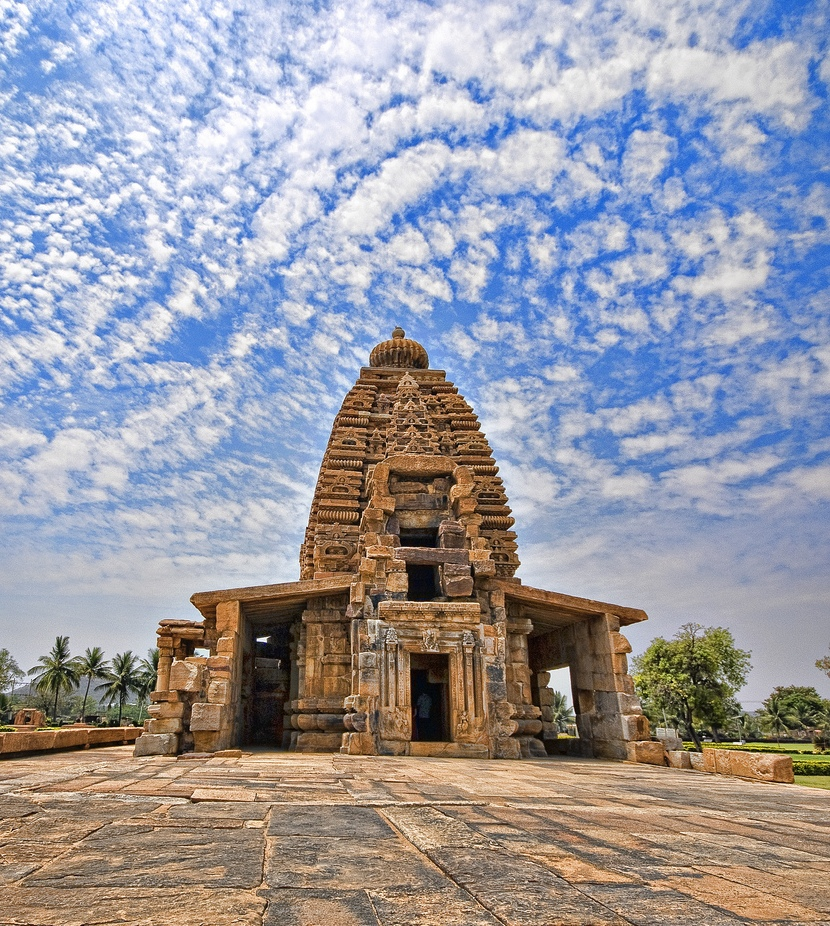
Galaganatha Temple at Pattadakal complex is an example of Badami Chalukya architecture.

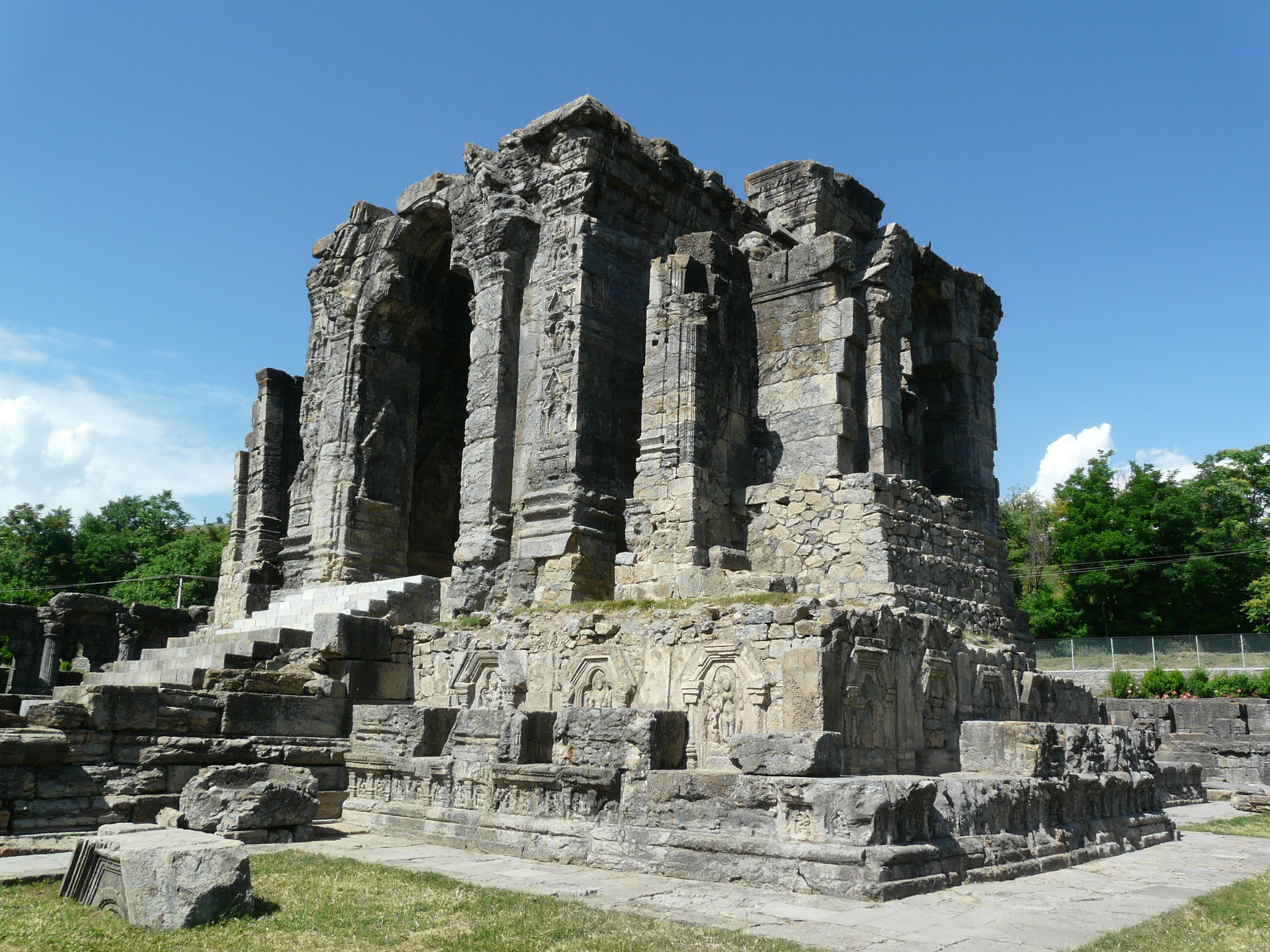
Martand Sun Temple Central shrine, dedicated to the deity Surya

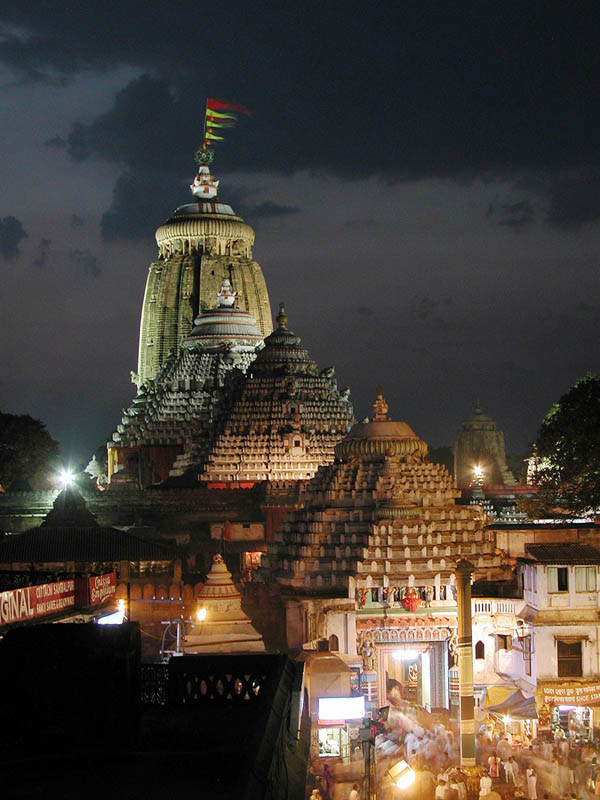
Jagannath Temple at Puri, one of Char Dham: the four main spiritual centers of Hinduism

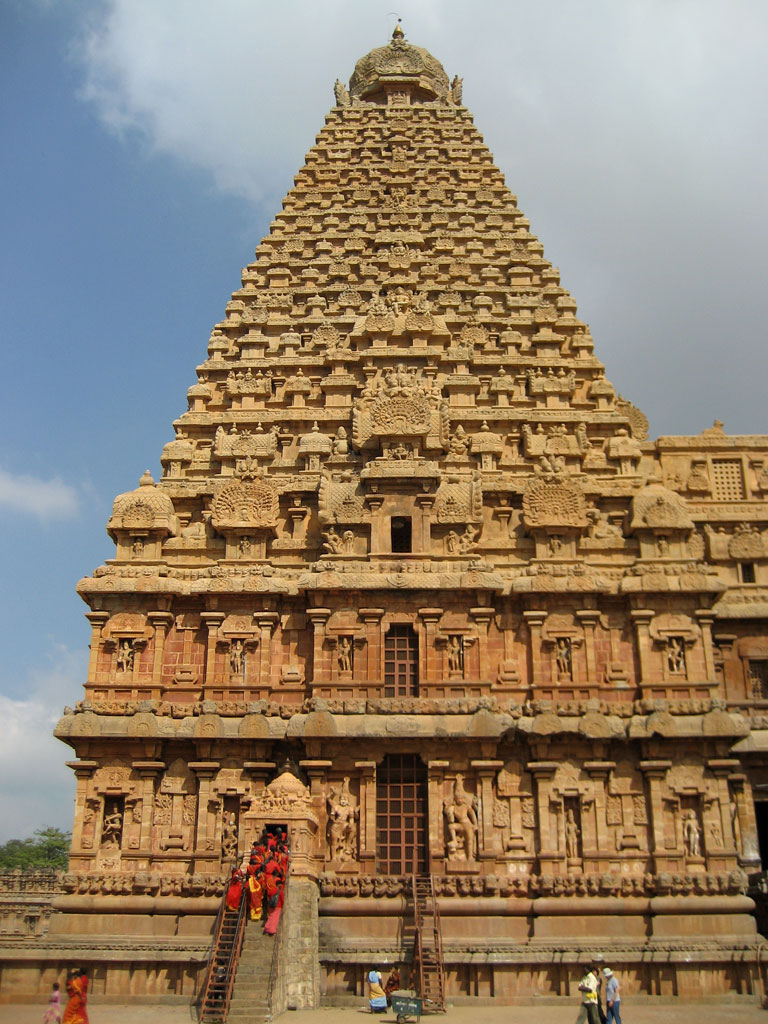
The granite tower of Brihadeeswarar Temple in Thanjavur was completed in 1010 CE by Raja Raja Chola I.

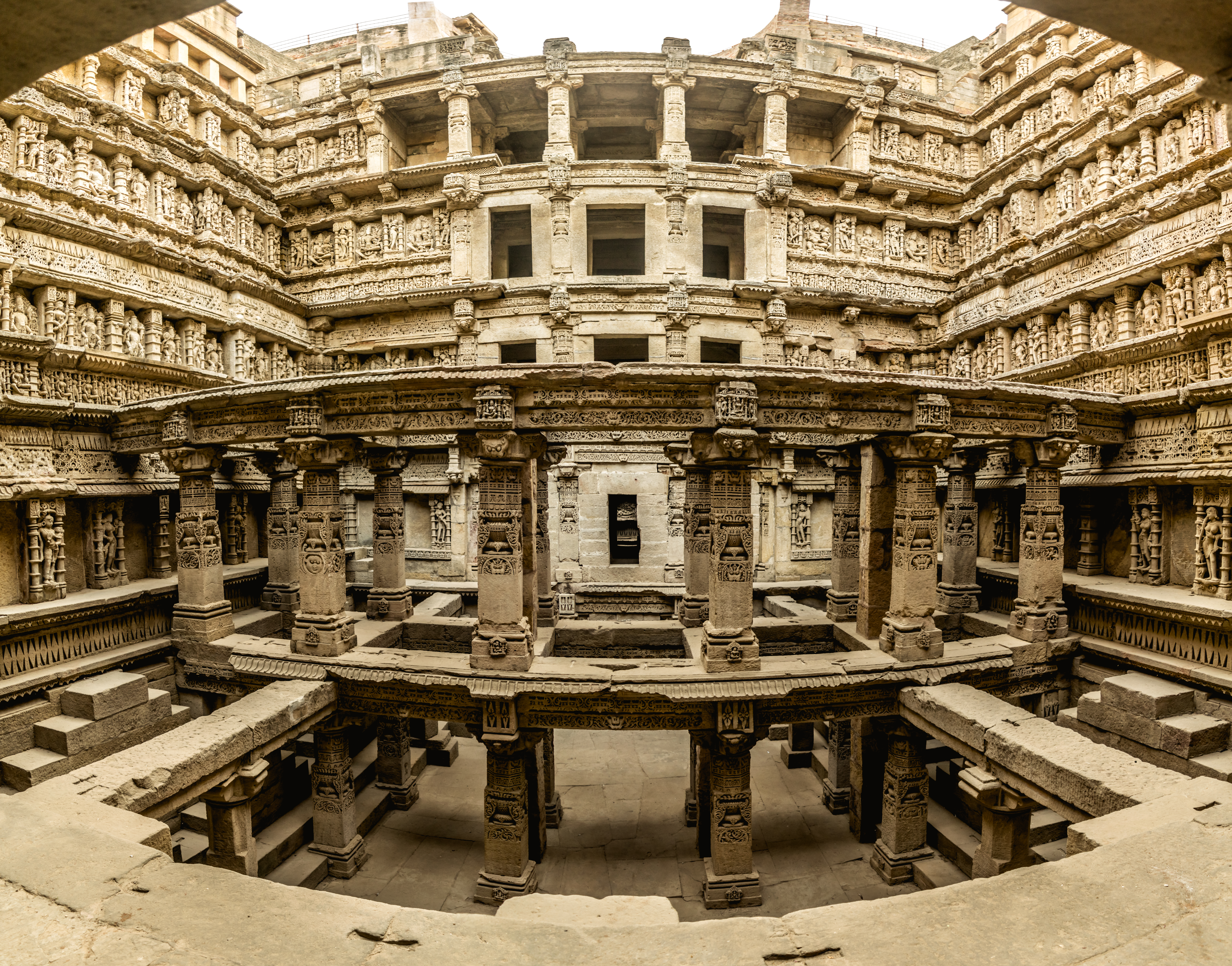
Rani ki vav is a stepwell, built by the Chaulukya dynasty, located in Patan.

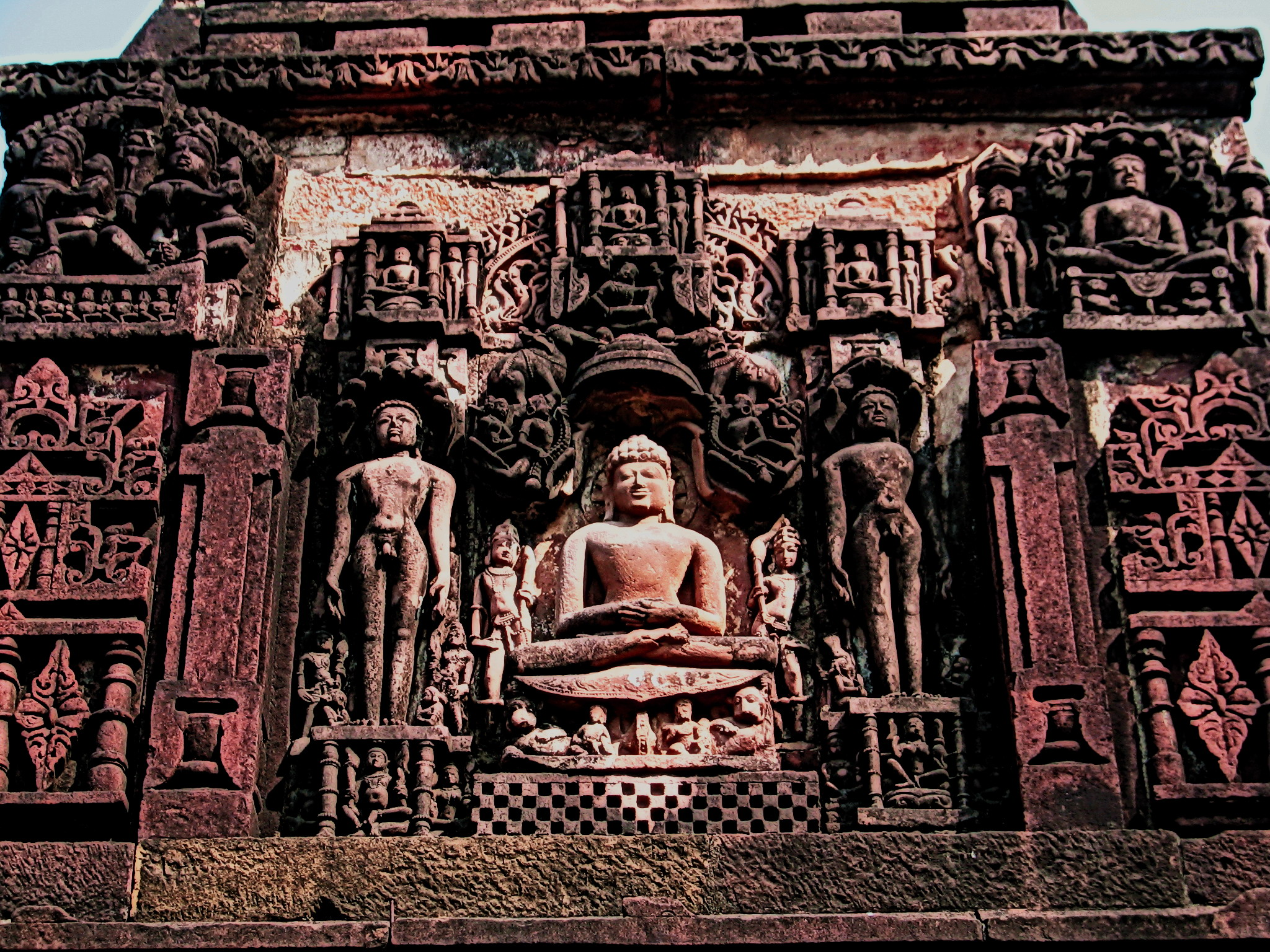
Wall of Jain Temple complex at Deogarh

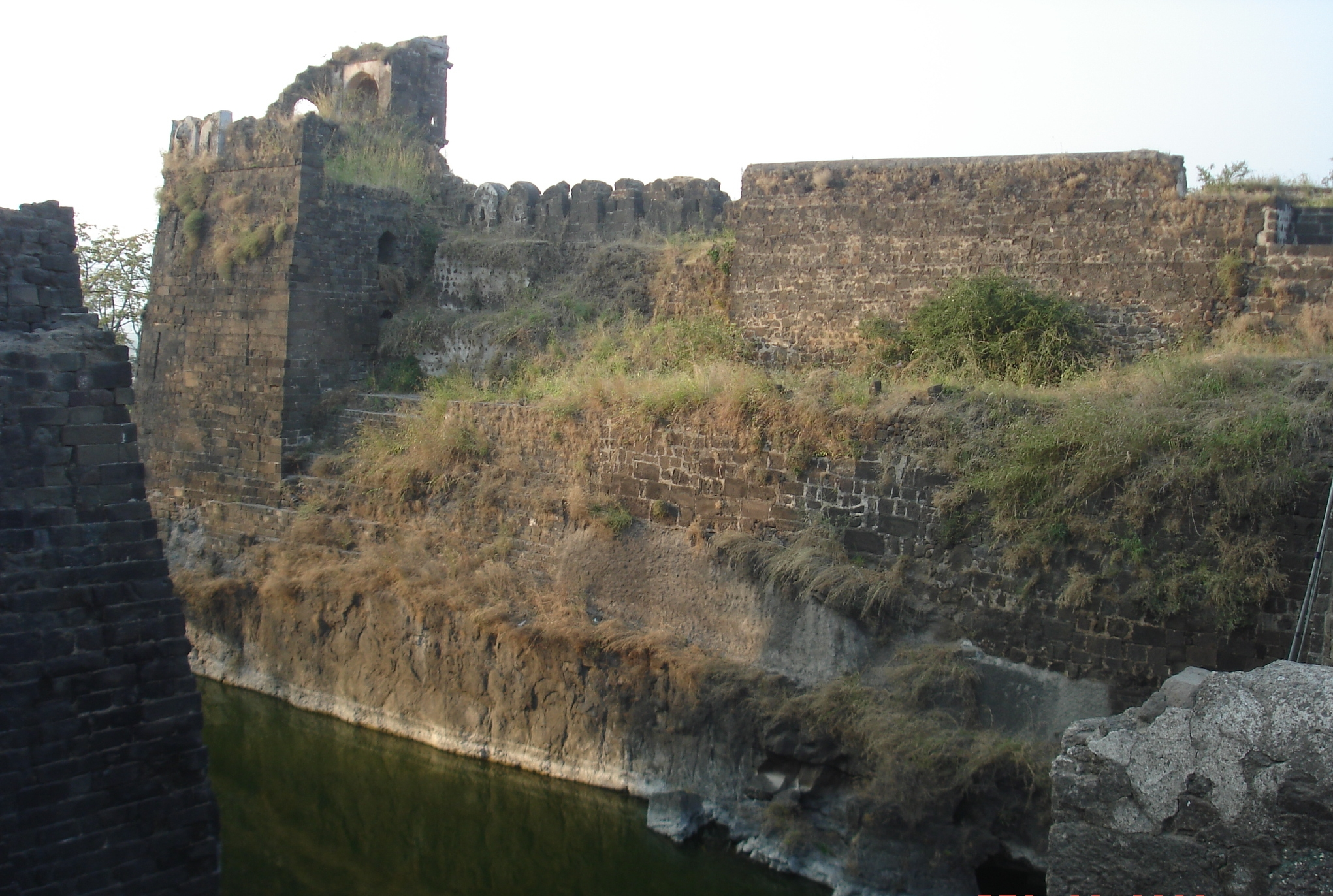
Devagiri fort, built by Yadava dynasty in the 12th century; according to Ibn Batutta, it was the most impregnable fort he had ever seen.

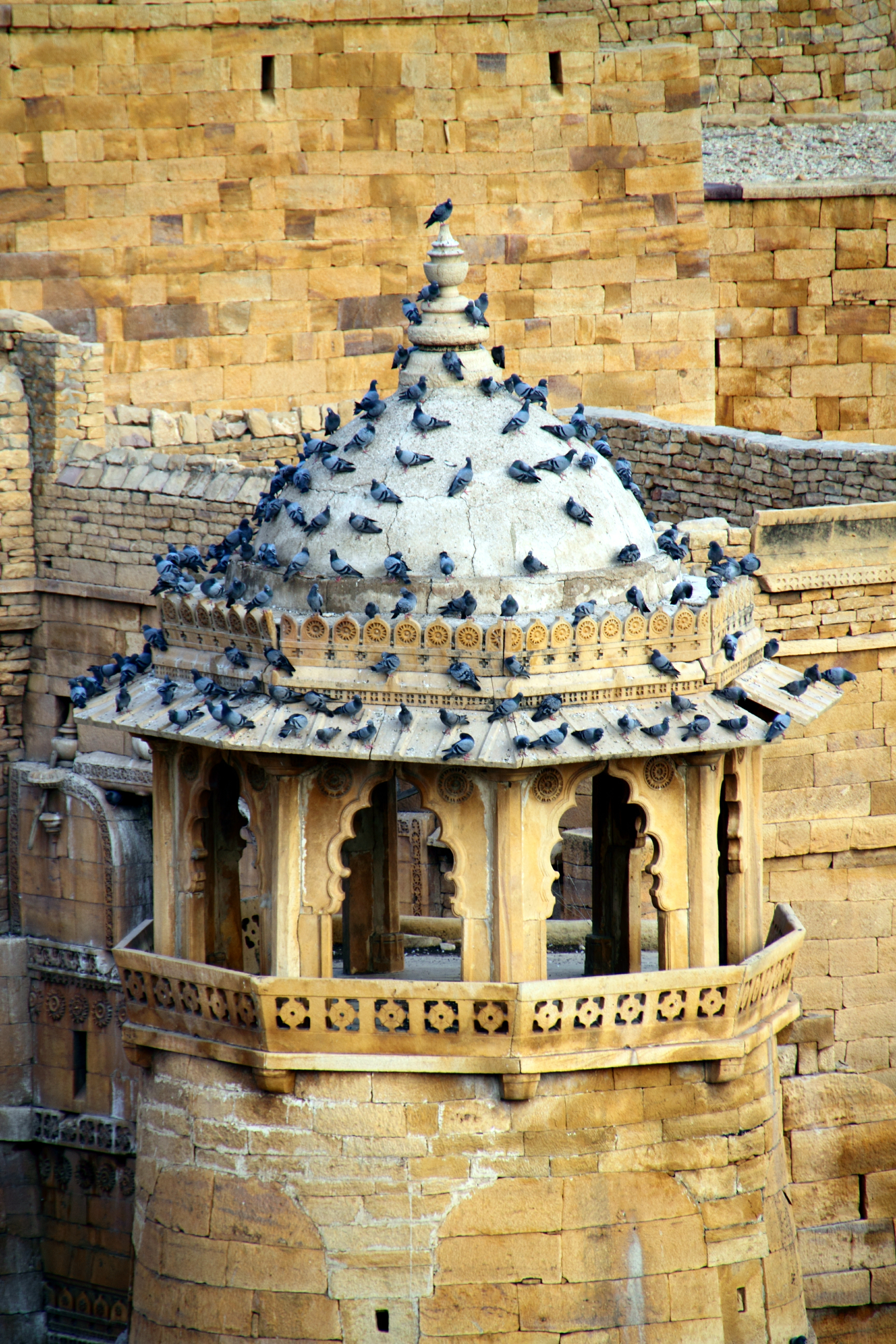
Jaisalmer Chhatri, 12th century CE

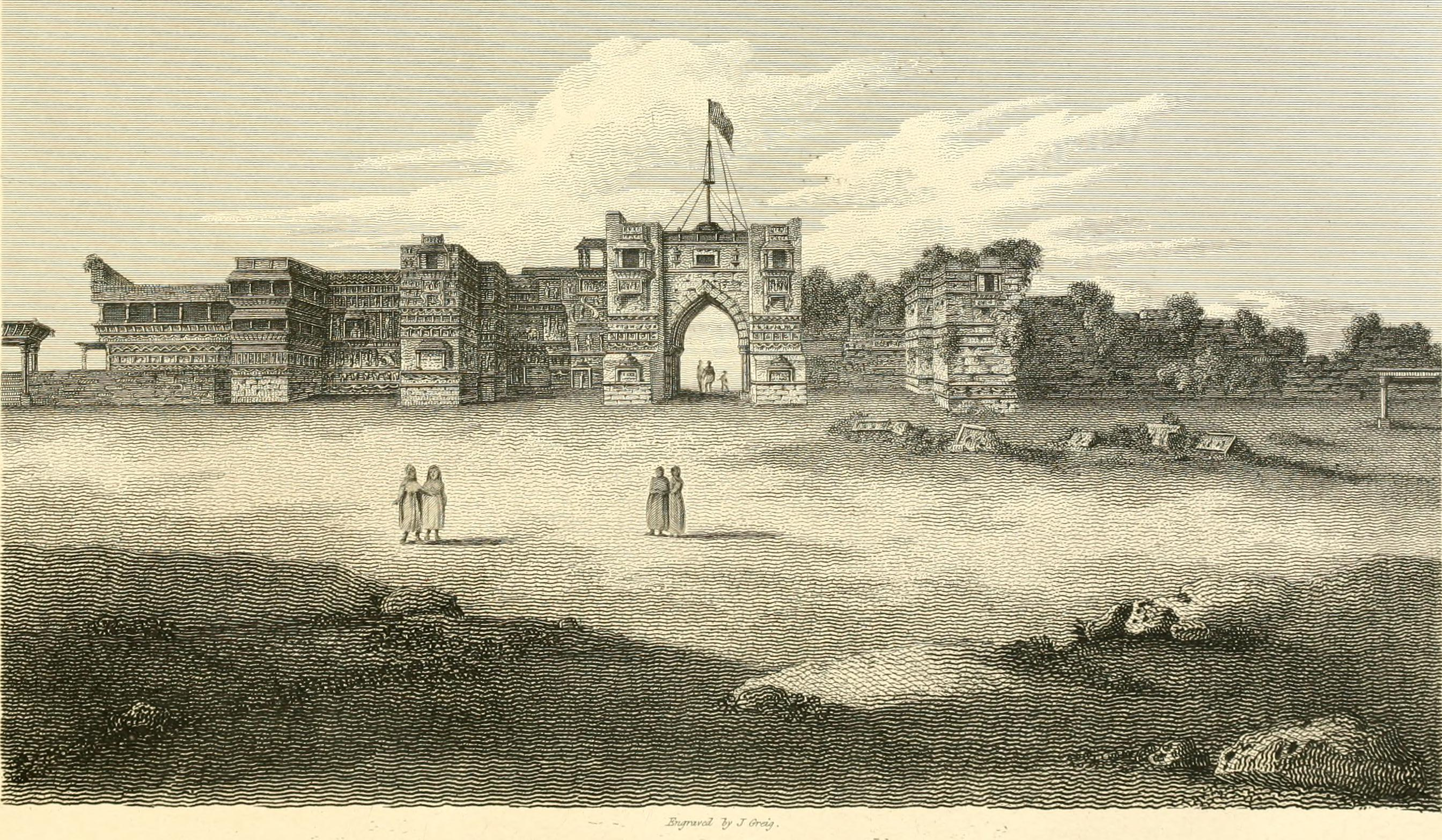
Hira Gate at Dabhoi Fort, 12th century CE

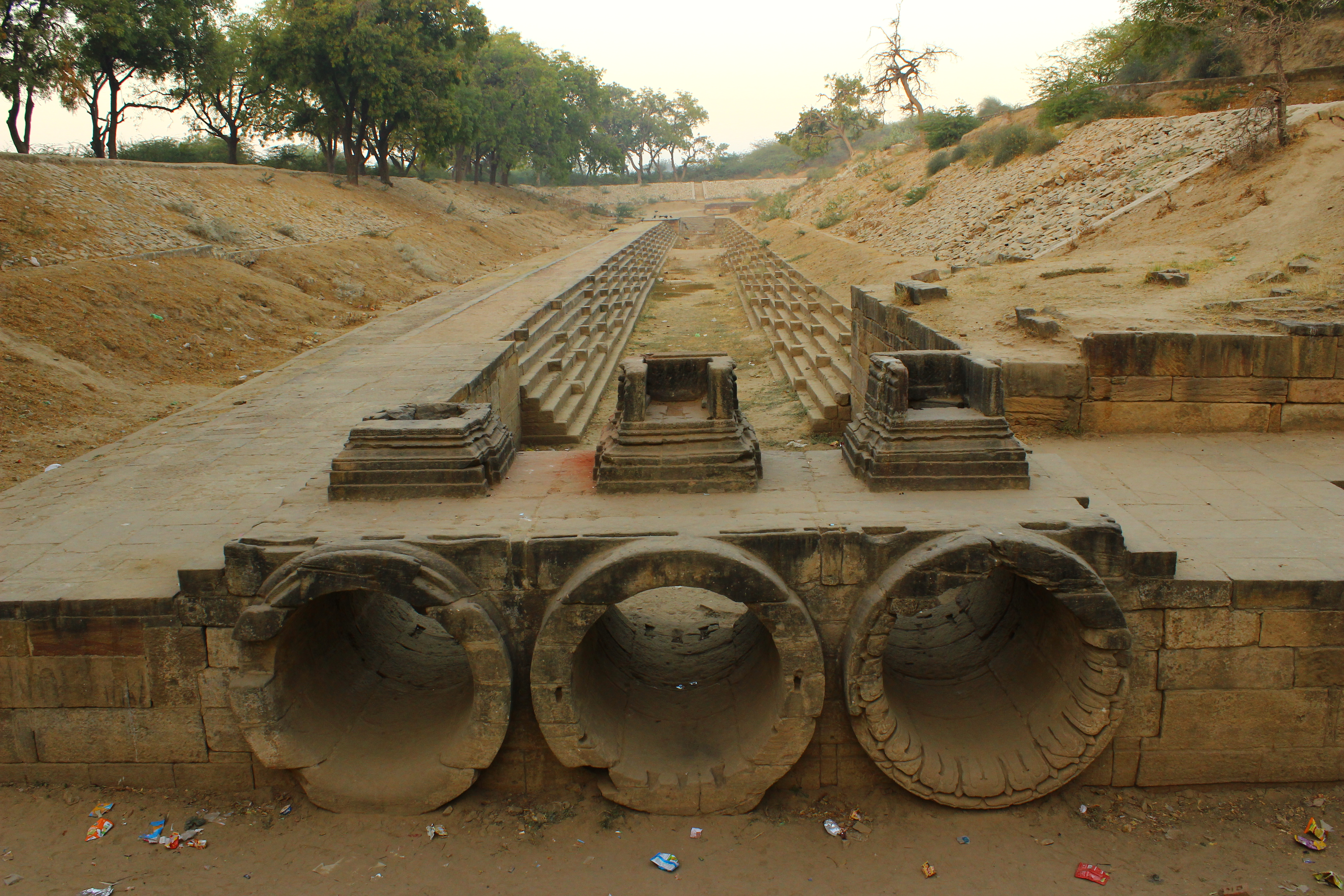
Sahasralinga Talav is a medieval artificial water tank commissioned during Chaulukya (Solanki) rule

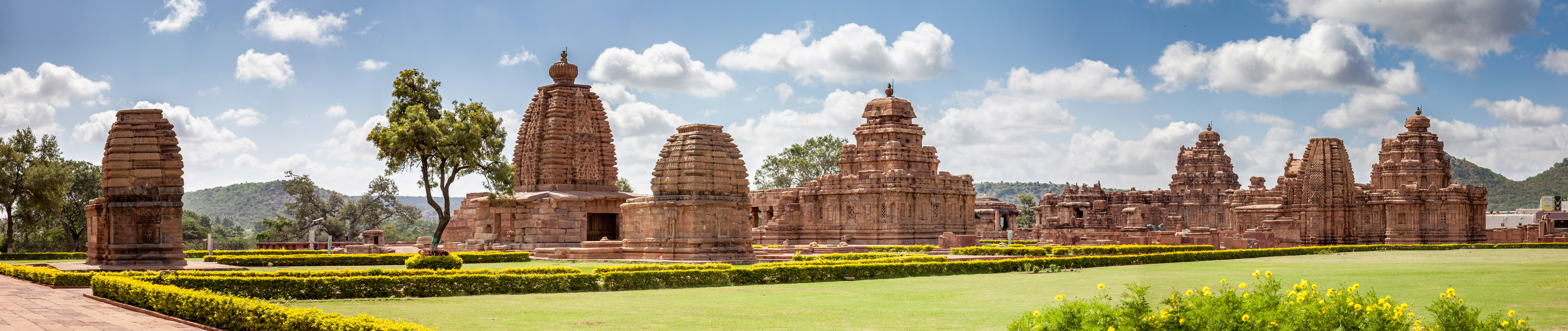
View of the main group at Pattadakal, a complex of 7th and 8th century CE, Hindu and Jain temples in northern Karnataka

=== Ancient Indian arches ===
Indian architecture has utilized mix of false and true arches in its architecture.

==== Corbel arches ====
Corbel arches in India date from Indus Valley Civilisation which used corbel arch to construct drains and have been evidenced at Mohenjo daro, Harappa, and Dholavira.

The oldest arches surviving in Indian architecture are the gavaksha or "chaitya arches" found in ancient rock-cut architecture, and agreed to be copied from versions in wood which have all perished. These often terminate a whole ceiling with a semi-circular top; wooden roofs made in this way can be seen in carved depictions of cities and palaces. A number of small early constructed temples have such roofs, using corbelled construction, as well as an apsidal plan; the Trivikrama Temple at Ter, Maharashtra is an example. The arch shape survived into constructed Indian architecture, not as an opening in a wall but as a blind niche projection from a wall, that bears only its own weight. In this form, it became a very common and important decorative motif on Hindu temples.

==== Arch ====
The 19th-century archaeologist Alexander Cunningham, head of the Archaeological Survey of India, at first believed that – due to the total absence of arches in Hindu temples – they were alien to Indian architecture, but several pre-Islamic examples bear testimony to their existence, as explained by him in the following manner:

Archaeological evidences indicate that wedge-shaped bricks and construction of wells in the Indus valley civilization, and although no true arches have been discovered as of yet, these bricks would have been suitable in the construction of true arches. The earliest arch appeared in South Asia as a barrel vault in the Late Harappan Cemetery H culture dated 1900 BC-1300 BC which formed the roof of the metal working furnace, the discovery was made by Vats in 1940 during excavation at Harappa. True arch in India dates from pre Mauryan Nanda period from 5th century BC. Arch fragment discovered by archaeologist K. P. Jayaswal from an arch with Brahmi inscribed on it, or 1st - 2nd century CE when it first appeared in Kausambi palace architecture from Kushana period.

Variety of Arches in Pre Islamic periods

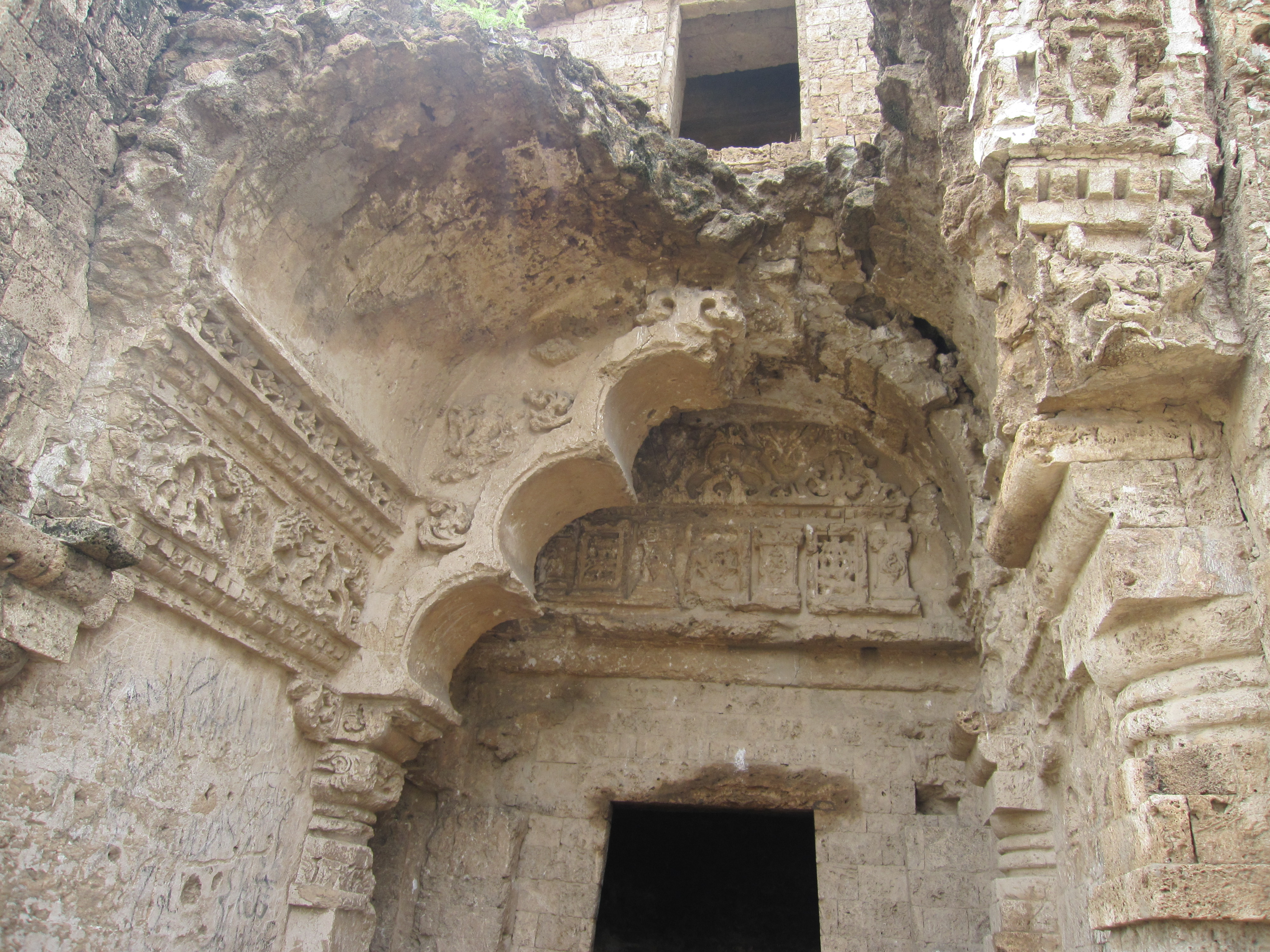
Multifoil arch, Kafirkot temple, Punjab, Pakistan, 7th–9th century CE

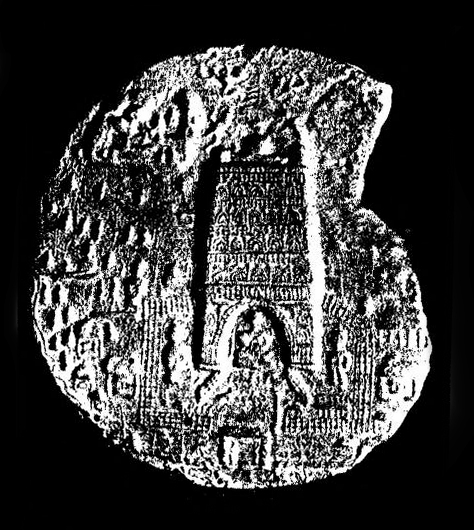
Parabolic arch, Mahabodhi Temple, 1st–2nd century CE

Pointed arch Mahabodhi temple, 6th–7th century CE, Late-Gupta period

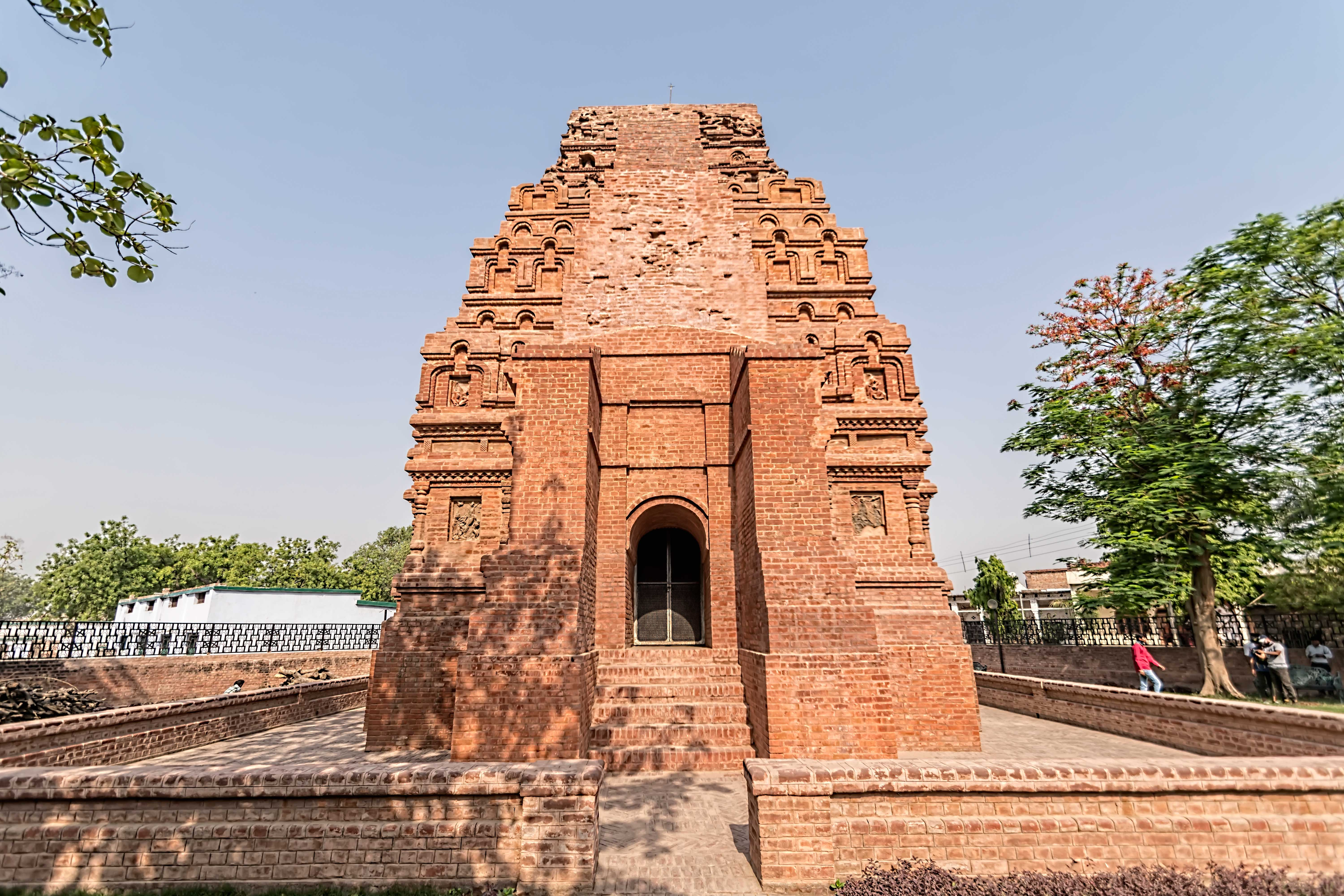
Semicircular arch, Bhitargaon temple, 4th–5th century CE (heavily reconstructed)

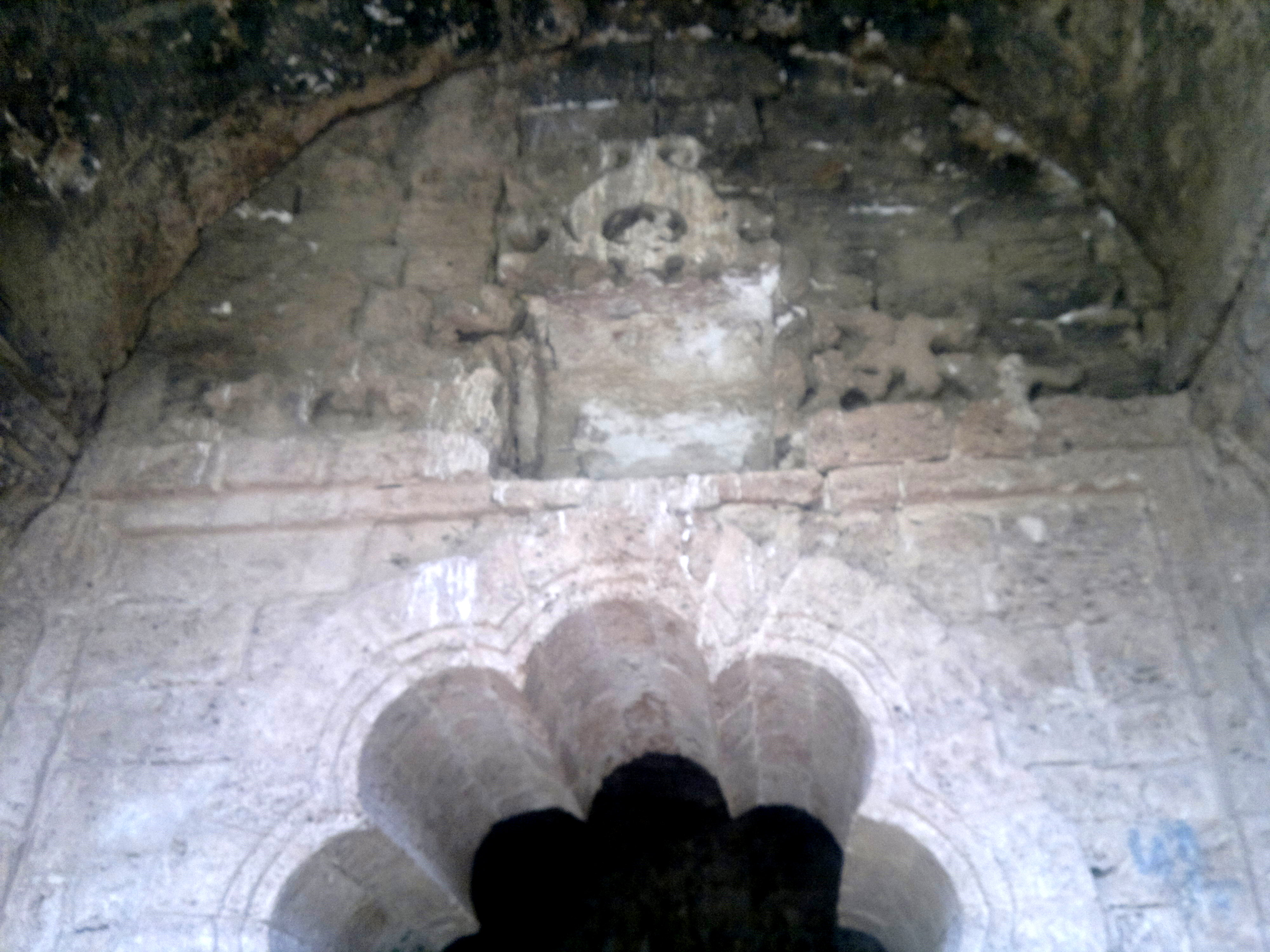
Multifoil arch at Amb, 7th–9th century CE, Hindu Shahis

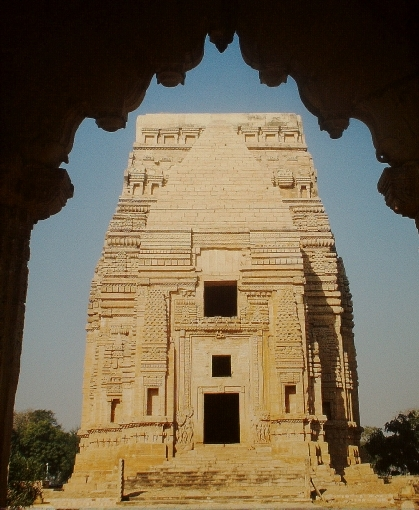
Teli ka Mandir gate with particular Rajput style arch, 8th century CE

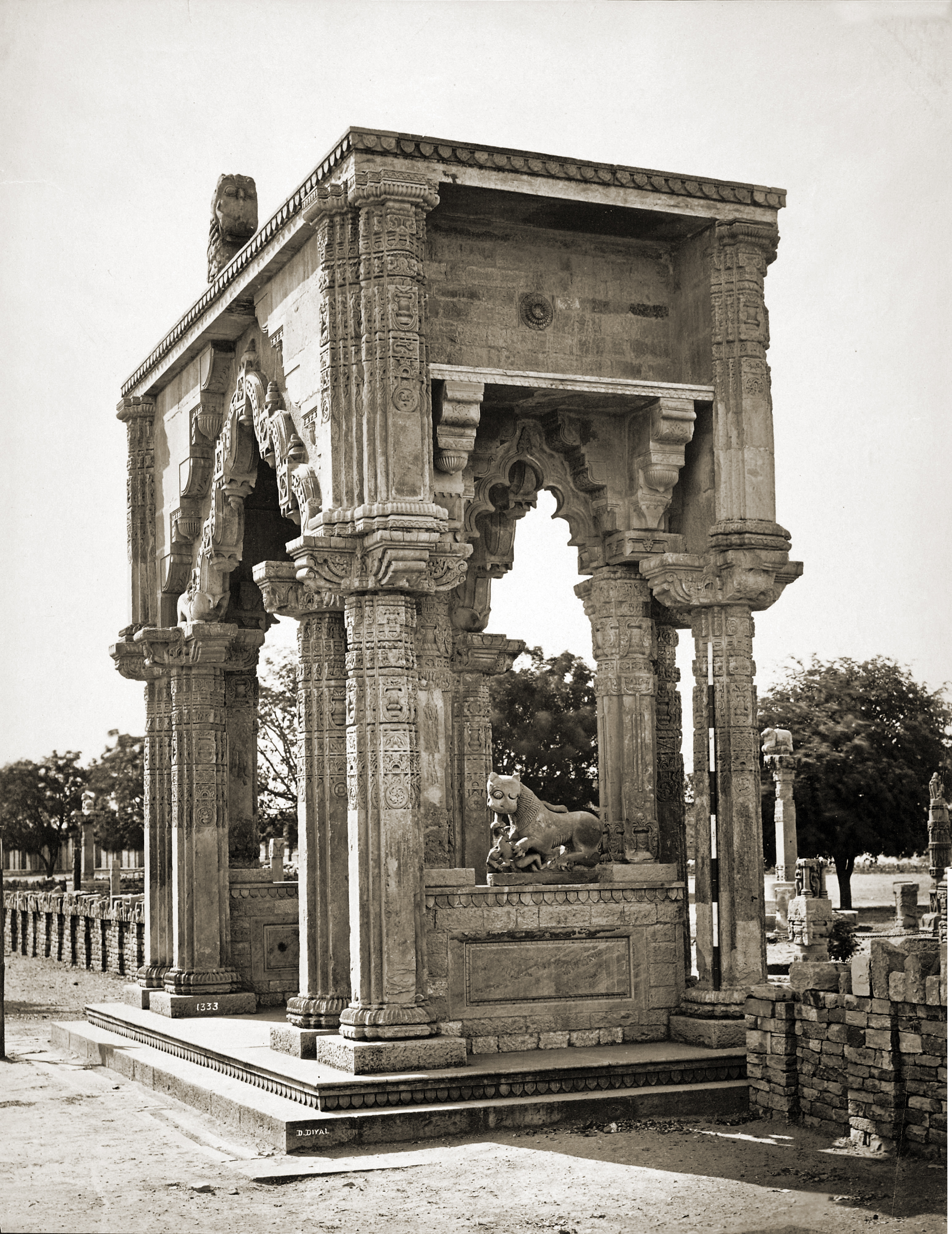
Teli ka Mandir gate with multifoil arch, 8th century CE

=== Fortification ===
Evidence indicates that the construction of fortification walls at Delhi applied nearly the same principle at Red Fort and Agra Fort as was the tradition during pre-Islamic Rajput periods. Excavation of Lal Kot beneath the Purana Qila revealed ruins which was constructed using similar method as in the post-Islamic and Mughal Periods.

Fortification of pre-Islamic Lal Kot and Agra Fort of Mughal era

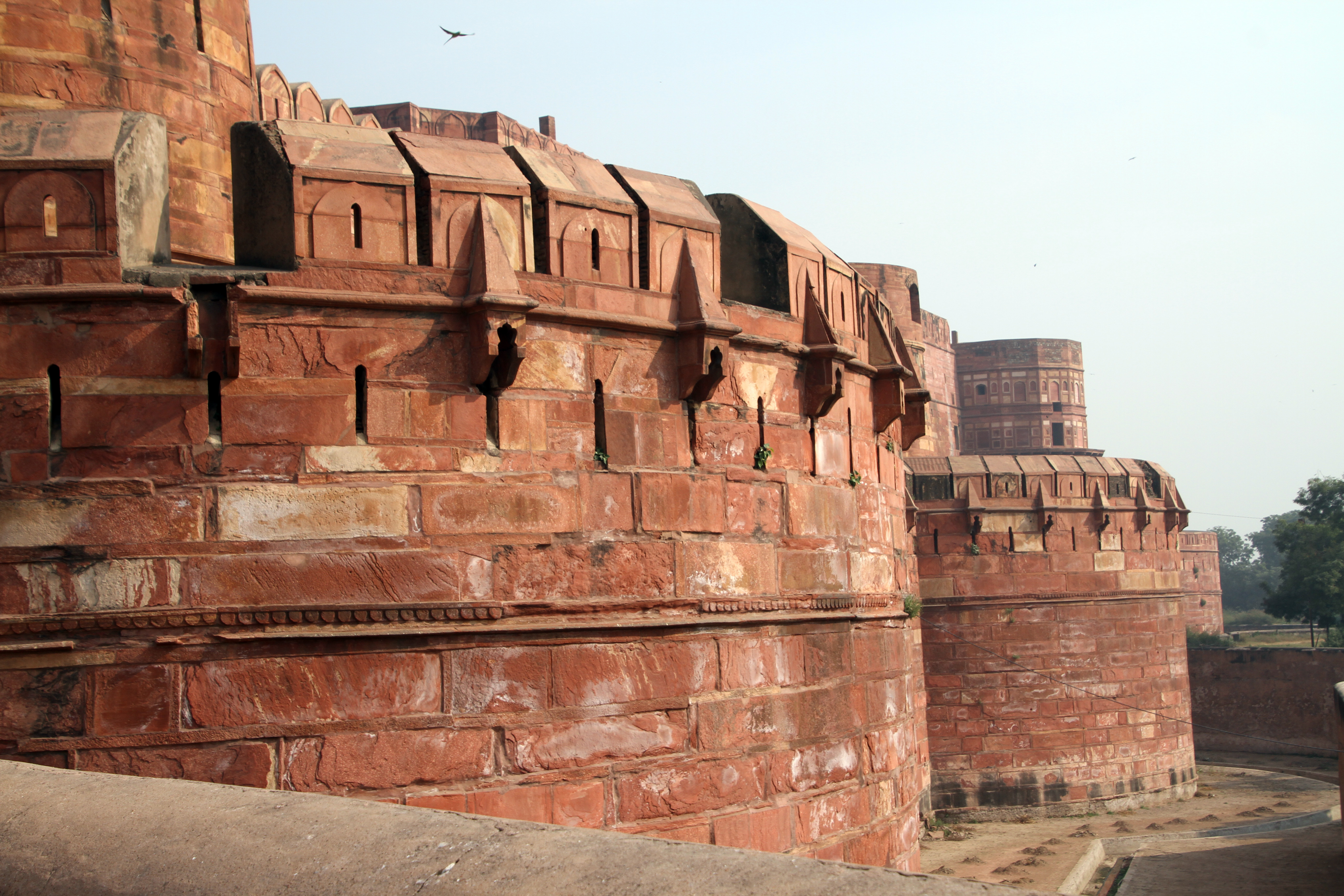
Agra Fort used the same technique for fortification walls.
