= Ellora (disambiguation) =

The Ellora Caves are some of the largest rock-cut monastery-temple cave complexes in the world, and a UNESCO World Heritage Site in Maharashtra, India.

Ellora may also refer to:

- Ellora Symphony by Yasushi Akutagawa, dedicated to the Ellora Caves
- Ellora's Cave, an American independent erotic fiction publisher
- Ellora Patnaik (born 1968), Indo-Canadian film, stage and television actress

== See also ==
- Elora (disambiguation)
