= Elora =

Elora may refer to:

- Elora, Ontario, a community in Ontario, Canada
- Elora, Tennessee, an unincorporated community in Lincoln County, Tennessee, United States
- Elora Danan, a character in the 1988 film Willow
- Elora (given name)
- Elora, a character from the Spyro series

== See also ==
- Ellora (disambiguation)
- Elora: a Hebrew name meaning God is my light or shield of victory
