= Alora =

Alora may refer to:

- Alora (gastropod), a genus of wentletraps in the family Epitoniidae
- Alora (drug), a brand name for transdermal Estradiol
- Álora, a town in southern Spain
- Alora (given name)
