= Elora (given name) =

- Pronunciation: /iːˈlɔːrə/; /ʌˈlɔːrə/; /eɪˈlɔːrə/; /ɛˈlɔːrə/; /iːˈlɑːrə/; /ʌˈlɑːrə/; /eɪˈlɑːrə/; /ɛˈlɑːrə/; /eɪˈlɔɪərə/
- Gender: Feminine

Origin
- Meaning: multiple origins

Other names
- Related names: Alaura, Álora, Alora, Alorah, Eliora, Ella, Elorah, Ellora, Elnora, Élora, Nora

Elora is a feminine given name of uncertain origin. It has become better known as the name of a child character in the 1988 fantasy film Willow. It might be a variant of the names Eliora, a Hebrew name meaning “God is my light”, or Elnora, an American combination of the names Ella and Nora. It also has roots in other cultures and, in some instances, might have been inspired by the recreation area at Elora, Ontario that was ultimately named after a site in India.

== Usage ==
The name has ranked among the 1,000 most popular names for newborn girls in the United States since 2015.

== People ==
- Elora Gohor, Bangladeshi actress
- Elora Hardy (born 1980), Canadian designer and founder of the company IBUKU
- Élora Pattaro (born 1986), Brazilian fencer

== Fictional characters ==
- Elora Danan, a character in the 1988 fantasy film Willow
- Elora Danan Postoak, a character in the Hulu/FX series Reservation Dogs
- Elora, a character from the Spyro series
