= Hindu theology =

Study of Hindu belief and divinity

Hindu theology is a field of intellectual inquiry dedicated to the exposition of Hindu scriptures (such as the Vedas or Āgamas), devotional texts (ex. the Nālāyira Divya Prabandham), and various other sources. Commentarial literature is especially abundant, a fact which has sometimes led Western observers to question the application of the term "theology" to Hindu traditions. Hindu traditions of theological writing vary widely in their concerns, as some treat ritual praxis as paramount whereas others emphasize intellectual cultivation. In religious studies, Hindu traditions are studied under both the labels "theology" and "philosophy", with differing emphases.

== Definition and debates ==
The use of the term "theology" to describe Hindu commentarial works is disputed within religious studies scholarship, a debate which goes back to the British colonial period. The recognition and reception of Hindu intellectual traditions by Western academics has played a significant role in shaping the terms used to describe them. In a 1936 work, C. Hayavadana Rao, a scholar of the Sanskrit Academy of Mysore, protested against the characterization of Hindu schools of thought (mainly Vedānta) as derivative due to their privileging of an authoritative root text rather than writing independent treatises, arguing that they should be treated as "philosophy" on par with the Western tradition going back to Plato.

The Hindu theologian Anantanand Rambachan writes that Sarvepalli Radhakrishnan, widely regarded as an early proponent of "Indian philosophy" as a field, actively chose the term "philosophy" over "theology" due to a desire to present Indian thought as rational, not doctrinally bound, and proximal to scientific inquiry and due to a prevalent view that "theology" is intrinsically Christian. Purushottama Bilimoria similarly locates Radhakrishnan in debates between pre-independence Indian philosophers concerned to lift up a "scientific" or "empirical" strand in Indian thought, and argues that Radhakrishnan systematically re-read concepts in Advaita Vedānta to make them amenable to Western paradigms.

Interpreting Advaita Vedānta as a theological tradition, Rambachan offers his own understanding of theology as a rational explication of scriptural texts, which he argues does not necessarily "imply identity with the methods of Christian theology". Kiyokazu Okita, a scholar studying Gauḍiya Vaiṣṇavism, raises multiple conceptions of "theology" which may describe the form and purposes of Hindu commentarial works: discourses on or accounts of God ("God-talk"), the interpretation of scriptural texts ("scriptural exegesis"), and the understanding of a tradition's teachings articulated by and for its members ("insider discourse").

Jonathan Edelmann, another scholar of this tradition, considers the primary obstacle to the use of the term "theology" is the criticism that it comes out of a Euro-Christian tradition of thought that is not identical with the self-understanding of Hindu traditions. Edelmann argues that the difference between Hindu "theology" and Hindu "philosophy" (a term which is often applied to the subject of Hindu religious thought in general) is that the latter does not presuppose the authority or legitimacy of a particular religious text or system of faith, whereas theology does. Hindu theology therefore should be understood as discussion of Hindu religious belief from a position which permits the exegesis of Hindu religious texts as a means of understanding that belief. Francis Clooney similarly describes theology as a field of study which is "sufficiently respectful of religious sources and authorities so as to allow them to affect how one thinks [but] likewise open to logical and reasoned conclusions which are powerful enough to change how religious people think about their beliefs".

== God in Hinduism ==
The existence of a deity or multiple deities has been a subject of debate across Hindu traditions, and there are a wide range of perspectives. The early hermeneutic tradition of Mīmāṃsā was primarily focused on the accurate understanding of Vedic injunction and proper performance of sacrificial rituals. It was relatively unconcerned with the existence of a transcendent deity, but some commentators offered other arguments for the reality of deities.

In his commentary on the Pūrvamīmāṃsa Sūtras of Jaimini, Śabarasvāmin (c. 6th-7th century CE) argued for the nominal existence of deities as identical with the names in the Vedic mantras and as the recipients of sacrifices. His commentator, Kumārila Bhaṭṭa, was critical toward the notion of a creator God but attempted to fold in regional festivals for deities under the purview of Mīmāṃsā. He was also broadly critical of non-Vedic religious traditions that were emerging in his time (such as Buddhism), including traditions generally considered to be "Hindu" (ex. Śaivism and Vaiṣṇavism). Writing in the Śrīvaiṣṇava tradition, Vedānta Deśika (14th century CE) argued for a theistic understanding of Mīmāṃsā along with the Upaniṣads in his Seśvaramīmāṃsā.

In other intellectual traditions, such as Nyāya (the Hindu school of logicians), Jayanta Bhaṭṭa (9th century CE) later argued for the existence of God as both creator and the author of the Vedas in the Īśvarasiddhi ("proof of the Lord") section of his magnum opus, the Nyāyamañjarī ("Bouquet of Logic").

=== God's relationship to creation ===
The foundational Hindu scriptures, the Vedas and Upanishads, do not hold a position of creation ex nihilo unlike the God in Abrahamic religions. God is simultaneously embodied in as well as the cause of creation. This gives rise to a theological debate around the precise relationship between the divine and the act and result of creation. The Samkhya school holds to a dualistic conception of reality as composed of two states of being; material and spiritual. In this conception, the material principle evolves of its own accord into complex forms without the need for direction or oversight by an external, spiritual force. The Vedanta school instead holds that a single, unitary principle (i.e., God, Brahman) comprises all of reality, giving rise to both the material and spiritual.

=== One God or many gods ===
The number of gods and their relation to one another changes through the scriptural corpus of Hinduism, with the earliest Vedas demonstrating a more straightforward Indo-European derived polytheism, evolving in the Upanishads and beyond into what Zaehner describes as "pantheistic monism". This monism was the position held by Vedanta Desika, who argued that the one universal principle, the "lord of the universe", as revealed by "proper exegesis and clear reasoning", (Note: These quotes are Clooney's, not Desika's.) is the god Narayana. Desika insisted that the notion of divine perfection could only make sense in a framework that upholds a single god as the highest principle.

=== Incarnation of God ===
There are many figures in Hinduism that are generally believed to be avatars, incarnations of a god in the mortal world. These include Krishna and Rama, both avatars of Vishnu. The exact implications of this represent another important theological question, particularly for the Shaiva and Vaishnava sects which place particular importance on the embodiment of their chief deities. Theologians from both sects have argued that an all-powerful god would be able to incarnate itself in a mortal body, because definitionally that god has the power to do anything, and as a spiritual being a god could inhabit a body without being subject to the limitations of mortality just as the spiritual soul is able to inhabit a body without itself being mortal.

== Bhakti ==
Bhakti (Sanskrit: भक्ति) is a central concept in many schools of Hinduism, a relationship of love and devotion shared between a deity and a worshipper. The origin of this concept and its spread throughout North India in the fifteenth century led to a fundamental change in Hindu theology, with scriptural interpretation and exegesis coming to place a focus on bhakti as the primary spiritual goal. In Edelmann's exegetic definition of theology, the practice of bhakti is the "instrument" with which sacred text is "churned" (theologically meditated upon and interpreted).

One of the ways in which the tradition of bhakti impacted Hindu spirituality was its reframing of the relationship between man and the divine as a personal one which anyone could engage in as an individual, without the need for intercession by high-caste priests (i.e., Brahmins). Religious scholar Jon Keune describes this as "God's radical inclusivity".

== Scripture ==
The study, interpretation and exegesis of scripture is central to Hindu theology, with Edelmann describing it as the "essential feature". Okita writes that "the study of Hindu theology cannot be done without examining its commentarial traditions."

=== Adhikāra ===
Scripture is held to be so important that in some schools, the right to read certain 'advanced' texts is reserved to those with a particular 'qualification' or 'eligibility', a state called adhikāra acquired through a process of initiation overseen by the initiate's spiritual teacher. In general, the process of initiation into an intellectual tradition and the chain of disciplinary succession established thereby has traditionally been seen as essential for becoming educated in Hindu theology. Okita repeatedly describes the fundamental purpose of scripture to a Hindu practitioner as being soteriological; i.e., promoting spiritual growth to attain the goal of liberation from the cycle of death and rebirth. In that framework, adhikāra is seen as necessary so that a practitioner can obtain the prerequisite knowledge and states of mind necessary to properly absorb the more 'advanced' texts and gain the spiritual benefit thereof. Without this qualification, the teachers of these spiritual traditions hold that these more esoteric texts can obscure the divine truth from a practitioner rather than revealing it.

=== Exegesis ===
The perspectives offered by the root texts of Hindu scripture on the nature of the divine, particularly in cases where the divine is conceptualised as incarnate in a human form such as Krishna, may be easily misunderstood or subject to conflicting interpretations. For this reason, scriptural commentary provided by authors from within the Hindu spiritual tradition provide a basis from which the academic study of Hindu theology can build a more accurate picture of the heterodox understanding of the texts and their implications.

Analysing the Chandogya Upanishad, Edelmann writes of exegesis (""churning" and thereby theology in this Hindu context") as reflective of a broader demand for dedication and labour towards personal spiritual development in Hindu thought; the idea that "truth exists within the sacred text, but theology is needed to find it." He cites the exegesis of Hindu theologians to explain how individual canonical texts can be "like the sun, illuminating the truer meanings of other canonical texts" and therefore shaping a broader field of theology which relies on the interpretation and synthesis of the whole corpus of canonical scripture to provide an understanding of an underlying divine truth.
