= Alora (given name) =

- Gender: Female
- Language: English

Origin
- Meaning: Variant of Elora

Alora is a given name and surname of various origins. As an English given name, it is sometimes considered a modern spelling variant of the name Elora. Alora is a Spanish word meaning "at that hour". Álora is also a town in southern Spain.

== Usage ==
It was in use as early as 1940, when Dorothy Lyma, an aspiring actress in Hollywood who had a rumored affair with Frank Sinatra, used the stage name Alora Gooding. It has been among the 1,000 most used names for newborn girls in the United States since 2018 and among the top 300 names for newborn American girls since 2022. It has been among the top 1,000 names for newborn girls in England and Wales since 2021.

== Fictional characters ==
- Alora, a character in the video game Star Wars Jedi Knight: Jedi Academy
- Alora, a character in the 1978 film The Big Fix
- Alora, a character in the 1999 film Walking Across Egypt
