= Ellora Caves =

Ancient cave temples in Maharashtra, India

- Location within India Location within Maharashtra
- 20.0268°N 75.1771°E
- Type: Monolithic caves
- Location: Aurangabad district, Maharashtra, India

Site notes
- Area: Indian

UNESCO World Heritage Site
- Type: Cultural
- Criteria: i, iii, vi
- Designated: 1983 (12th session)
- Reference no.: 243
- UNESCO Region: Asia-Pacific

The Ellora Caves are a UNESCO World Heritage Site in Aurangabad, India. It is one of the largest rock-cut cave complexes in the world, with artwork dating from AD 600–1000, including Hindu, Buddhist, and Jain caves. The complex is a leading example of Indian rock-cut architecture, and several are not strictly "caves" in that they have no roof. Cave 16 features the largest single monolithic rock excavation in the world, the Kailash temple, a chariot-shaped monument dedicated to the god Shiva. The Kailash temple excavation also features sculptures depicting various Hindu deities as well as relief panels summarizing the two major Hindu epics.

There are over 100 caves at the site, all excavated from the basalt cliffs in the Charanandri Hills, 34 of which are open to the public. These consist of 17 Hindu (caves 13–29), 12 Buddhist (caves 1–12) and 5 Jain (caves 30–34) caves, each group representing deities and mythologies prevalent in the 1st millennium CE, as well as monasteries of each respective religion. They were built close to one another and illustrate the religious harmony that existed in ancient India. All of the Ellora monuments were built during the Rashtrakuta dynasty (r. 753-982 AD), which constructed part of the Hindu and Buddhist caves, and the Yadava dynasty (c. 1187–1317), which constructed a number of the Jain caves. Funding for the construction of the monuments was provided by royalty, traders, and wealthy people from the region.

Although the caves served as temples and a rest stop for pilgrims, the site's location on an ancient South Asian trade route also made it an important commercial centre in the Deccan region. It is 29 km (18 mi) northwest of Aurangabad and about 300 km (190 mi) east-northeast of Mumbai. Today, the Ellora Caves, along with the nearby Ajanta Caves, are a major tourist attraction in the Marathwada region of Maharashtra and a protected monument under the Archaeological Survey of India (ASI).

== Etymology ==
Ellora, also called Verul or Elura, is the short form of the ancient name Elloorpuram. The older form of the name has been found in ancient references, such as the Baroda inscription of 812 AD, which mentions "the greatness of this edifice" and that "this great edifice was built on a hill by Krishnaraja at Elapura, the edifice in the inscription being the Kailasa temple. In the Indian tradition, each cave is named and has a suffix Guha (Sanskrit), Lena, or Leni (Marathi), meaning cave.

It is also thought to be derived from Ilvalapuram, named after the asura Ilvala, who ruled this region, who was vanquished by Sage Agastya.

== Location ==
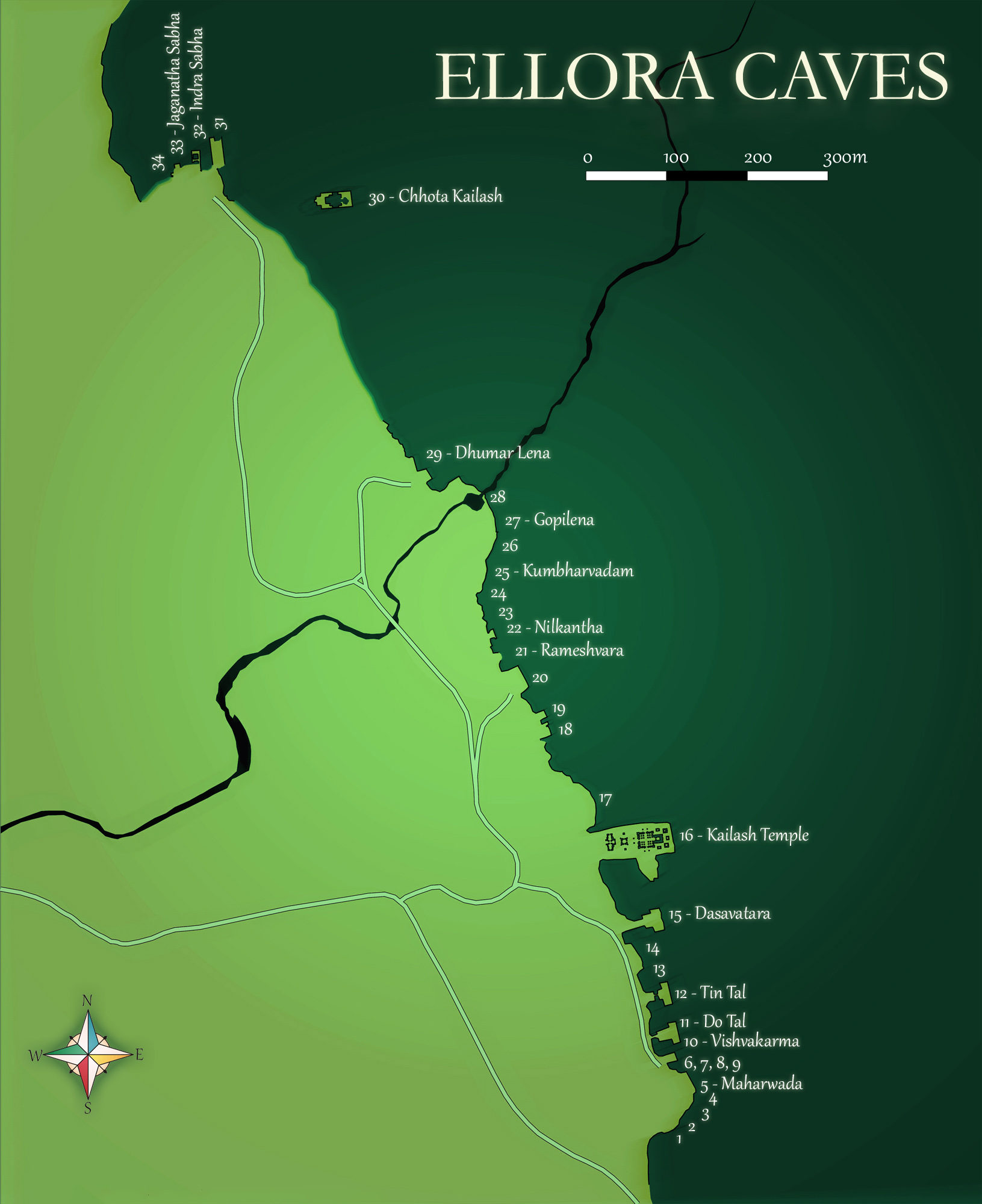
Ellora Caves, general map (the rock is depicted as dark green)

The Ellora caves are situated in state of Maharashtra about 29 km (18 mi) northwest of the city of Aurangabad, 300 km (190 mi) east-northeast of Mumbai, 235 km (146 mi) from Pune and about 100 km (62 mi) west of the Ajanta Caves another UNESCO World Heritage Site and 2.3 km (1.4 mi) from Grishneshwar Temple (India).

Ellora occupies a relatively flat rocky region of the Western Ghats, where ancient volcanic activity had created multilayered basalt formations, known as the Deccan Traps. The volcanic activity that formed the west-facing cliff that houses the Ellora caves occurred during the Cretaceous period. The resulting vertical face made access to many layers of rock formations easier, enabling architects to pick basalt with finer grains for more detailed sculpting.

== Chronology ==
The construction at Ellora has been studied since British colonial rule. However, the overlapping styles between the Buddhist, Hindu and Jain caves has made it difficult to establish agreement concerning the chronology of their construction. The disputes generally concern: one, whether the Buddhist or Hindu caves were carved first and, two, the relative dating of caves within a particular tradition. The broad consensus that has emerged is based on comparing the carving styles at Ellora to other cave temples in the Deccan region that have been dated, textual records of various dynasties, and epigraphical evidence found at various archaeological sites near Ellora and elsewhere in Maharashtra, Madhya Pradesh and Karnataka. Geri Hockfield Malandra and other scholars have stated that the Ellora caves had three important building periods: a Buddhist phase (~600 to 730 CE) and a later Hindu and Jain phase (~730 to 950 CE).

The earliest caves may have been built during the Traikutakas and Vakataka dynasties, the latter being known for sponsoring the Ajanta caves. However, it is considered likely that some of the earliest caves, such as Cave 29 (Hindu), were built by the Shiva-inspired Kalachuri dynasty, while the Buddhist caves were built by the Chalukya dynasty. The later Hindu caves and early Jain caves were built by the Rashtrakuta dynasty. Amoghavarsha could have built the early Jain temples. Later Jain caves were built by the Yadava dynasty, which had also sponsored other Jain cave temples.

== The Buddhist monuments: Caves 1–12 ==
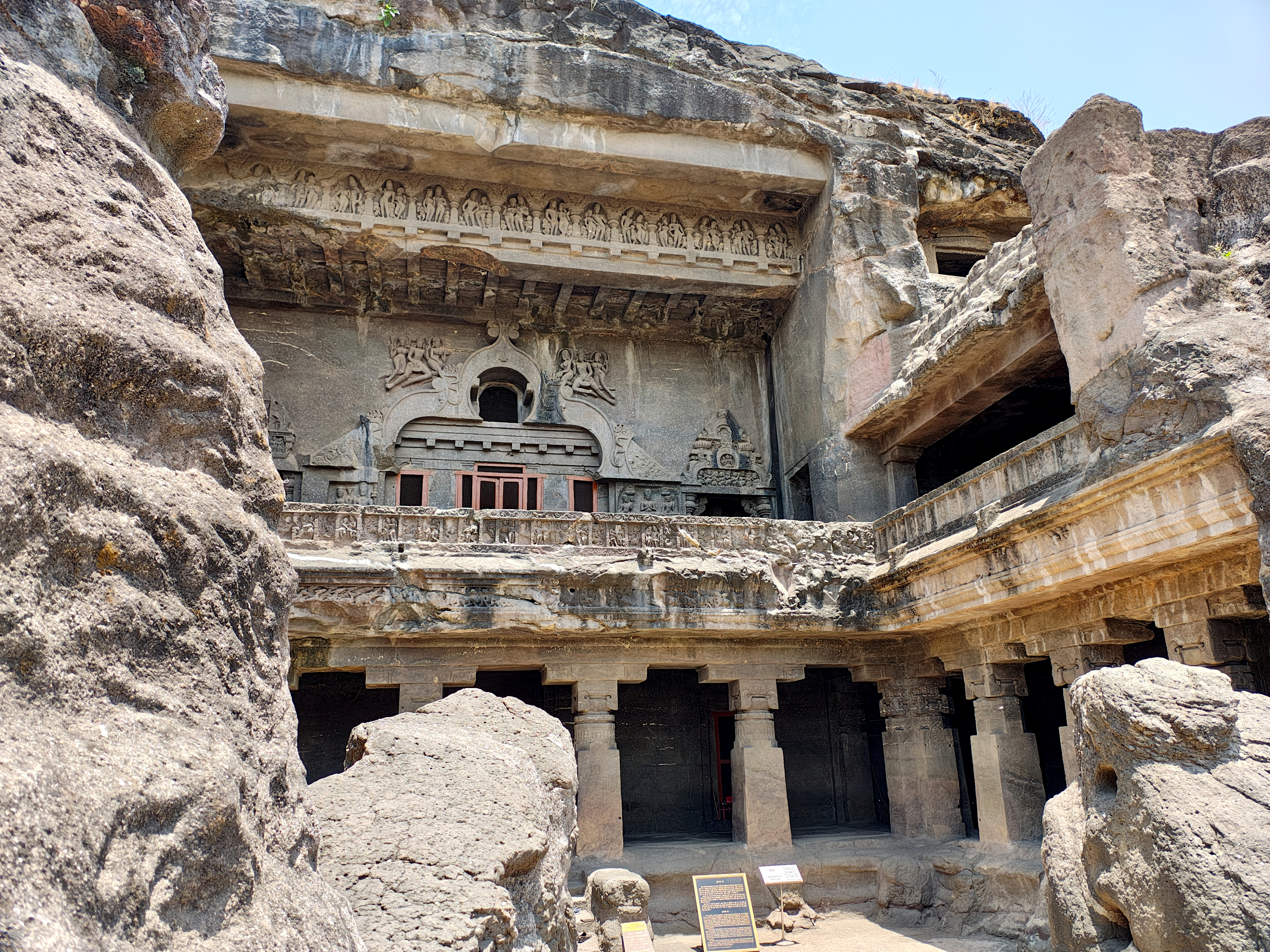
Ellora Cave No. 10

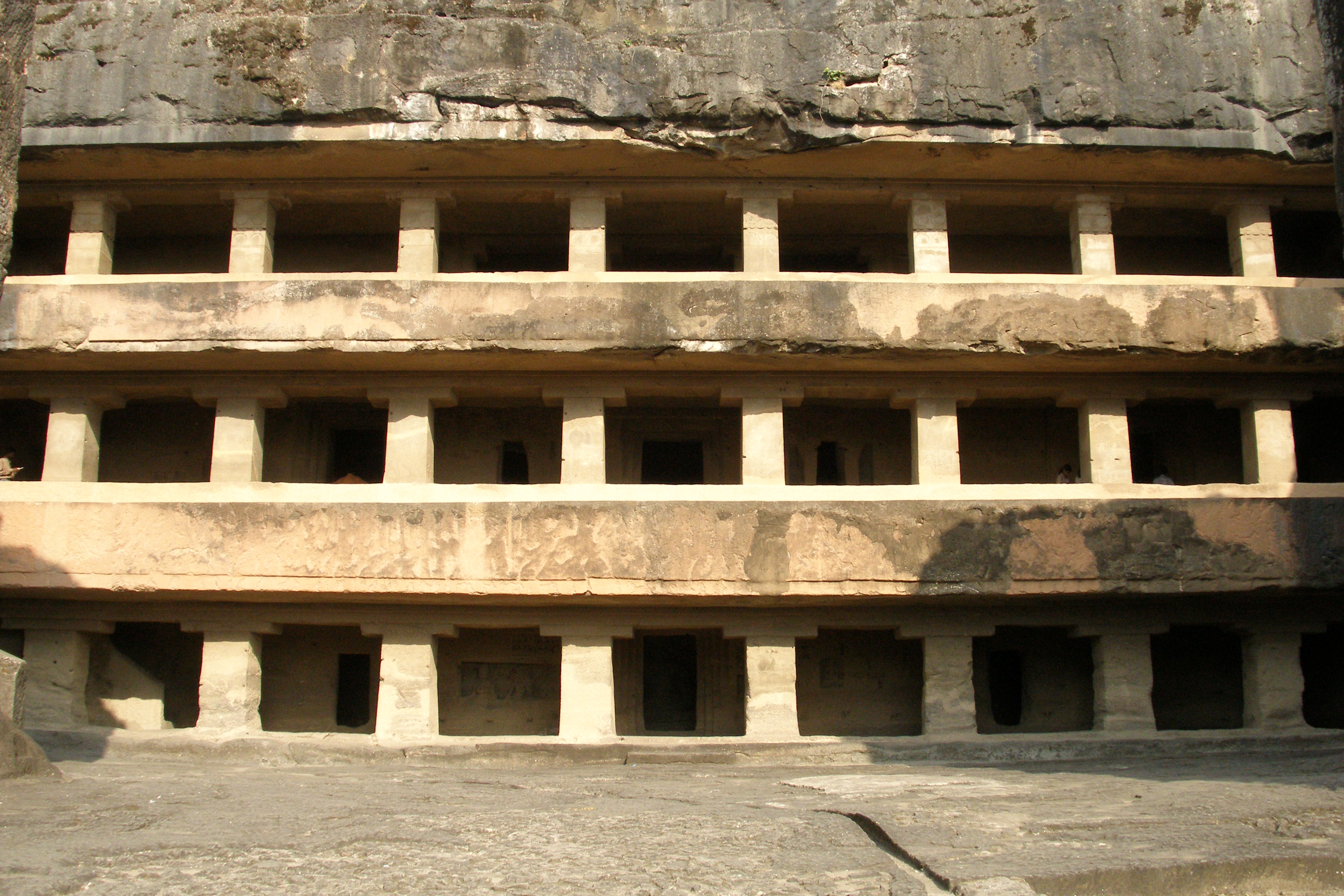
Caves 11 (above) and 12 are three-storey monasteries cut out of a rock, with Vajrayana iconography inside.

These caves are located on the southern side and were built either between 630 and 700 CE, or 600–730 CE. It was initially thought that the Buddhist caves were the earliest structures that were created between the fifth and eighth centuries, with caves 1–5 in the first phase (400–600) and 6–12 in the later phase (650–750), but modern scholars now consider the construction of Hindu caves to have been before the Buddhist caves. The earliest Buddhist cave is Cave 6, then 5, 2, 3, 5 (right wing), 4, 7, 8, 10 and 9, with caves 11 and 12, also known as Do Thal and Tin Thal respectively, being the last.

Eleven out of the twelve Buddhist caves consist of viharas, or monasteries with prayer halls: large, multi-storeyed buildings carved into the mountain face, including living quarters, sleeping quarters, kitchens, and other rooms. The monastery caves have shrines including carvings of Gautama Buddha, bodhisattvas and saints. In some of these caves, sculptors have endeavoured to give the stone the look of wood.

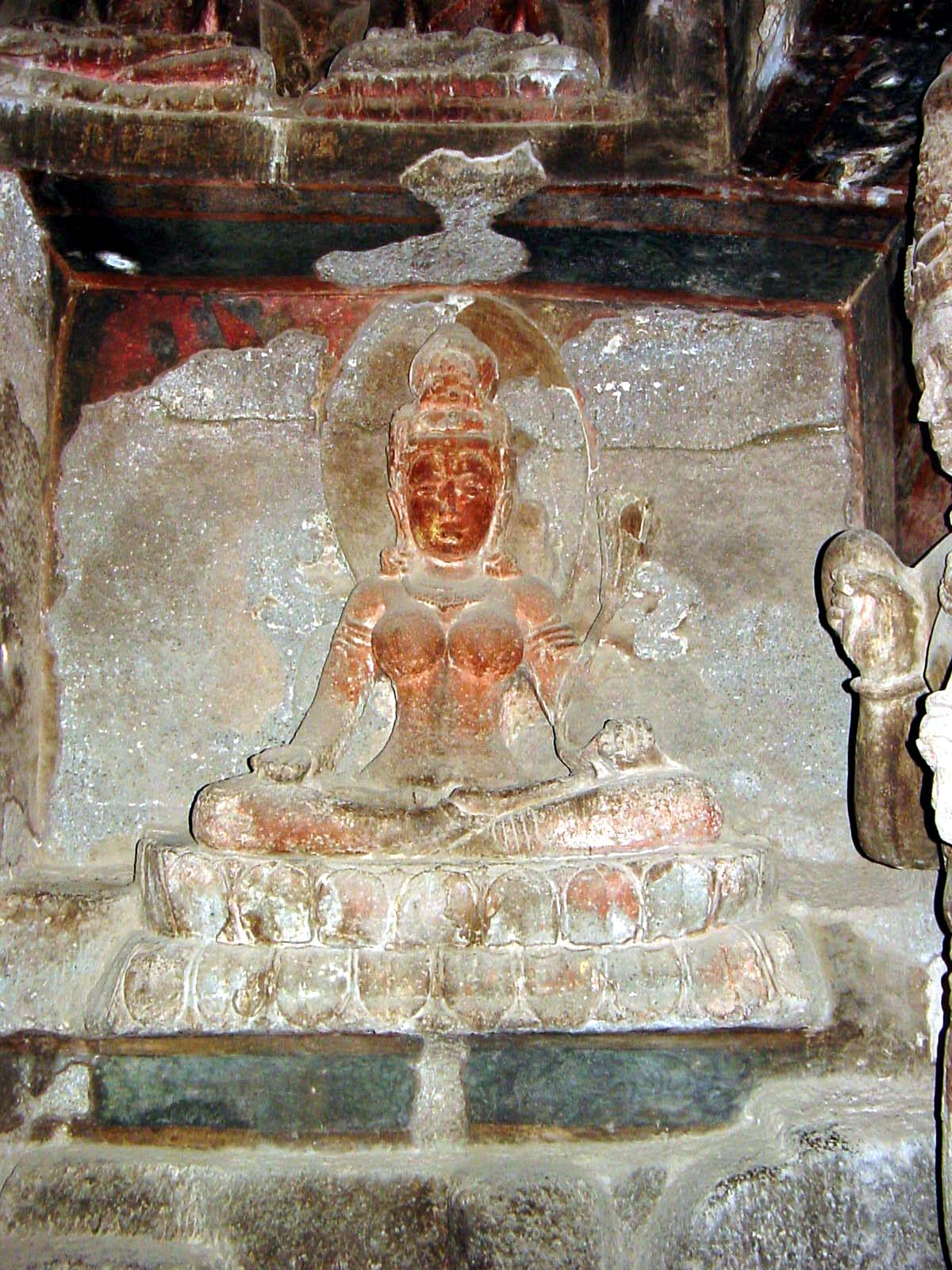
Numerous tantric Buddhist goddesses are carved in Cave 12.

Caves 5, 10, 11 and 12 are architecturally important Buddhist caves. Cave 5 is unique among the Ellora caves as it was designed as a hall with a pair of parallel refectory benches in the centre and a Buddha statue in the rear. This cave, and Cave 11 of the Kanheri Caves, are the only two Buddhist caves in India arranged in such a way. Caves 1 through 9 are all monasteries while Cave 10, the Vīśvakarmā Cave, is a major Buddhist prayer hall.

Caves 11 and 12 are three-storied Mahayana monastery caves with mandalas, numerous goddesses and Bodhisattva-related iconography belonging to Vajrayana Buddhism carved into the walls. These are compelling evidence to suggest that Vajrayana and Tantra ideas of Buddhism were well established in South Asia by the 8th-century CE.

=== The Vishvakarma Cave ===
Notable among the Buddhist caves is Cave 10, a chaitya worship hall called the 'Vishvakarma cave', built around 650 CE. It is also known as the "Carpenter's Cave", because the rock has been given a finish that has the appearance of wooden beams. Beyond its multi-storeyed entry is a cathedral-like stupa hall also known as chaitya-griha (prayer house). At the heart of this cave is a 15-foot statue of Buddha seated in a preaching pose.

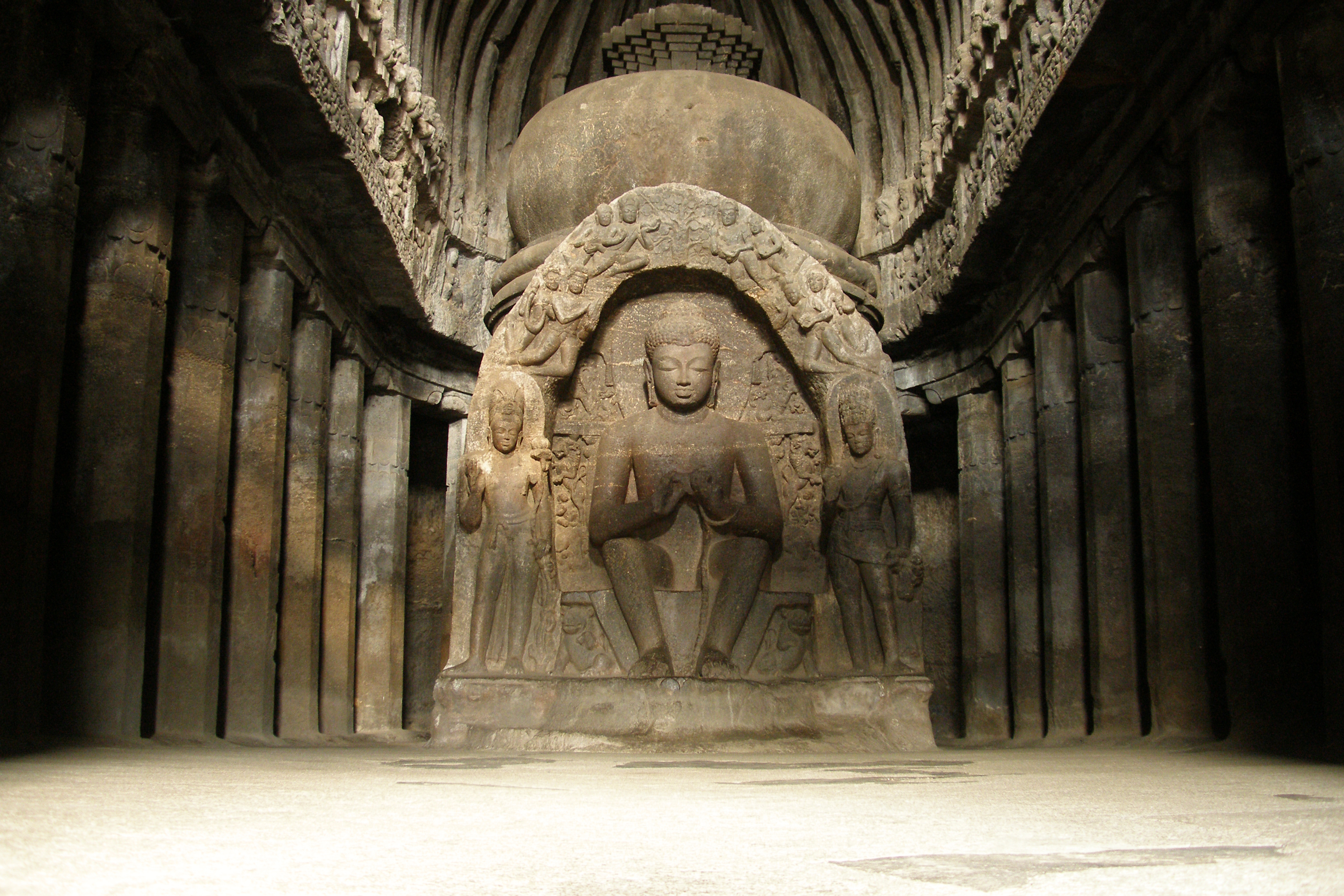
The Carpenter's cave (Buddhist Cave 10)

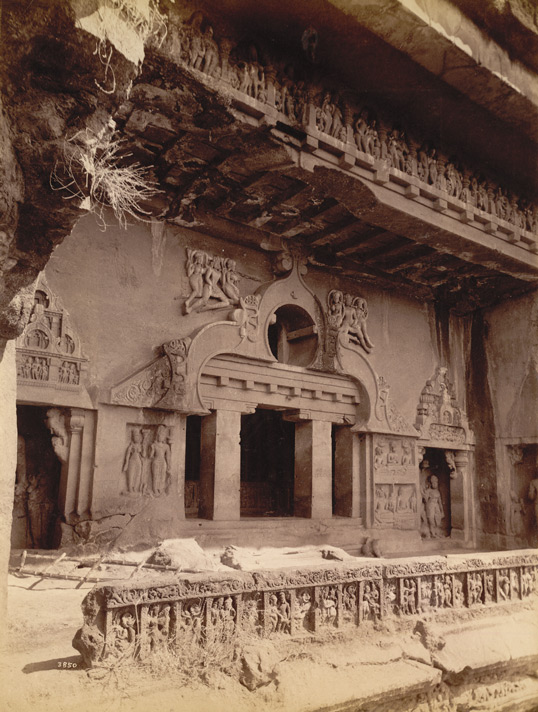
Facade outside Vishvakarma cave, Cave 10, 1890

Cave 10 combines a vihara with a chapel-like worship hall that has eight subsidiary cells, four in the back wall and four in the right, as well as a portico in the front. It is the only dedicated chaitya griha amongst the Buddhist caves and is constructed along similar lines to Caves 19 and 26 of Ajanta. Cave 10 also features a gavaksha, or chandrashala, arched window and a side connection to Cave 9 of Ellora.

The main hall of the Visvakarma cave is apsidal in plan and is divided into a central nave and side aisles by 28 octagonal columns with plain bracket capitals. In the apsidal end of the chaitya hall is a stupa on the face of which a colossal high seated Buddha in vyakhyana mudra (teaching posture). A large Bodhi tree is carved at his back. The hall has a vaulted roof in which ribs (known as triforium) have been carved in the rock imitating the wooden ones. The friezes above the pillars are Naga queens, and the extensive relief artwork shows characters such as entertainers, dancers and musicians.

The front of the prayer hall is a rock-cut court entered via a flight of steps. The entrance of the Cave has a carved facade decorated with numerous Indian motifs including apsaras and meditating monks. On either side of the upper level are pillared porticos with small rooms in their back walls. The pillared verandah of the chaitya has a small shrine at either end and a single cell in the far end of the back wall. The corridor columns have massive squared shafts and ghata-pallava (vase and foliage) capitals. The various levels of Cave 10 also feature idols of male and female deities, such as Maitreya, Tara, Avalokitesvara (Vajradhamma), Manjusri, Bhrkuti, and Mahamayuri, carved in the Pala dynasty style found in eastern regions of India. Some southern Indian influences can also be found in various works in this cave.

== The Hindu monuments: Caves 13–29 ==
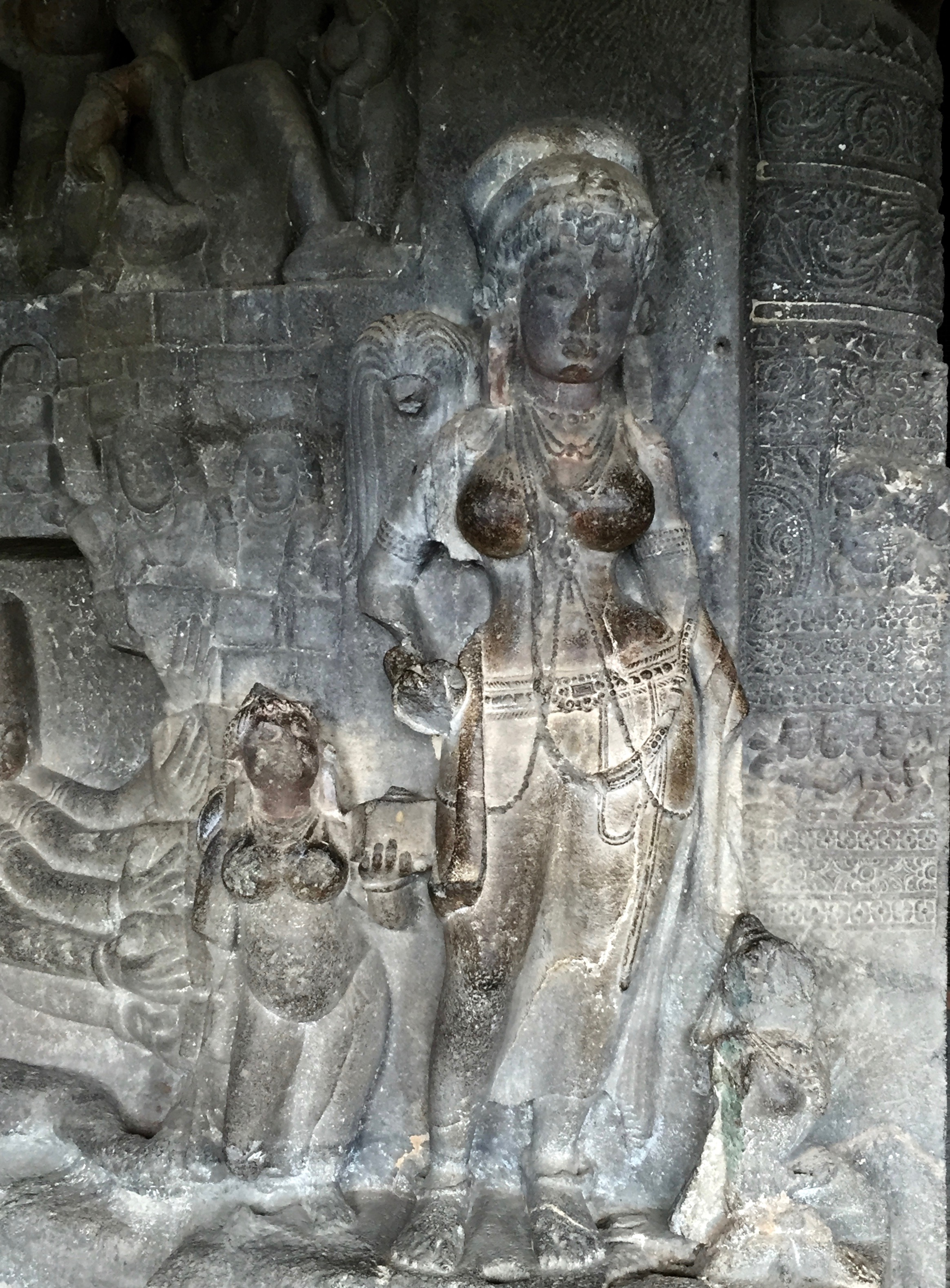
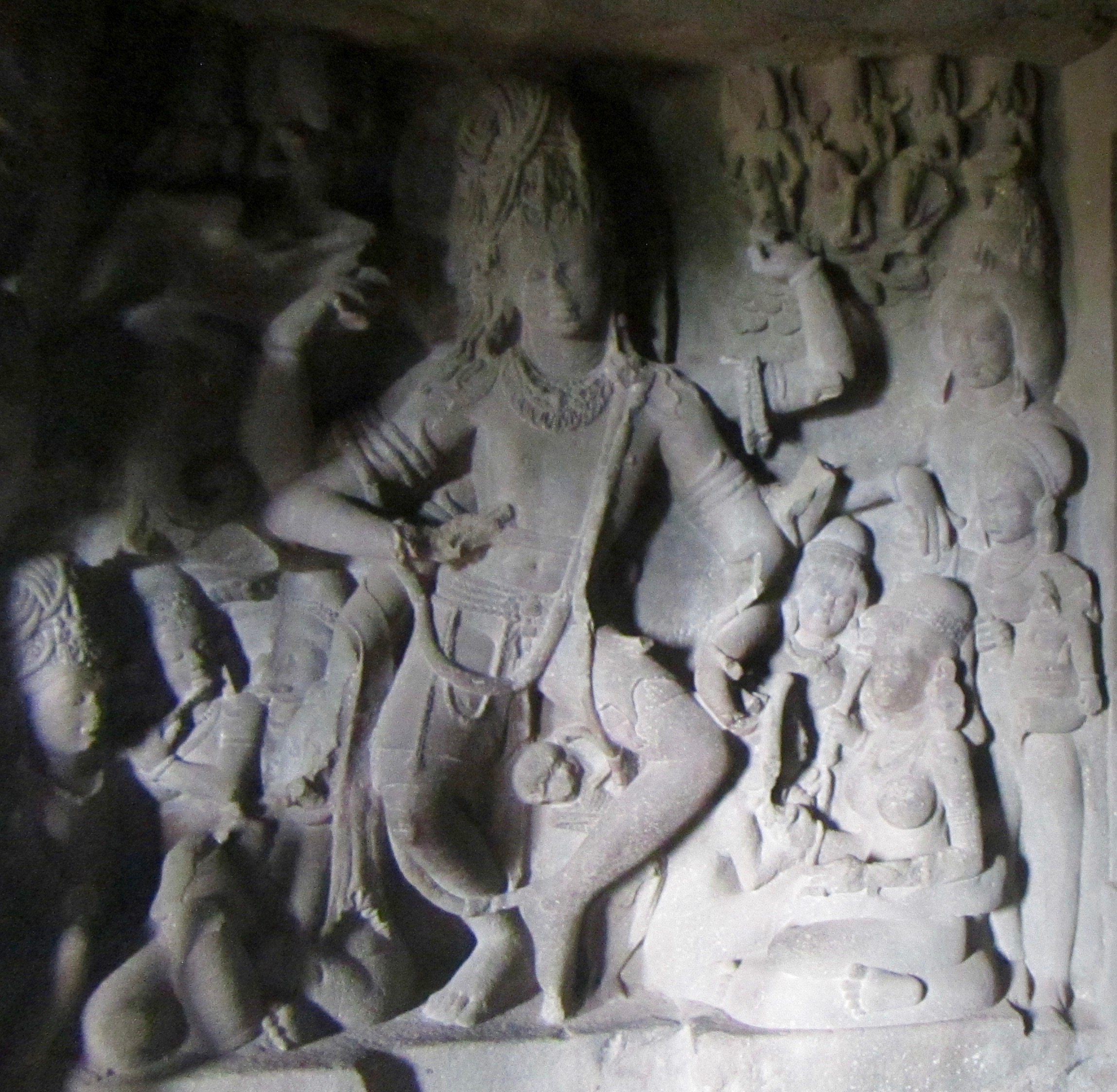
Parvati and Dancing Shiva (right) in an Ellora cave

The Hindu caves were constructed during the Kalachuri period, from the mid-6th century to the end of the 8th century in two phases. Nine cave temples were excavated early in the 6th century, followed by a further four caves (caves 17–29). Work first started , in order, on Caves 28, 27 and 19 then Caves 29 and 21, which were excavated concurrently with Caves 20 and 26. Caves 17 and 28 were the last ones to be started.

The later caves, 14, 15 and 16, were constructed during the Rashtrakuta period, some being dated to between the 8th to 10th centuries. Work first began in Caves 14 and 15 with Cave 16, the "world's largest single monolith", that is located in the Kailash temple in Maharashtra, India, being the last of the three to be constructed. These caves were completed in the 8th century with the support of king Krishna I.

=== Early Hindu temples: Dhumar Lena, Cave 29 ===
.These early caves were generally dedicated to the Hindu god Shiva, although the iconography suggests that the artisans gave other gods and goddesses of Hinduism prominent and equal reverence. A common feature of these cave temples was a rock-cut linga-yoni within the core of the shrine with each being surrounded by a space for circumambulation (parikrama).

Cave 29, also called Dhumar Lena, is one of earliest excavations in Ellora and among the largest. Early Hindu temple building in the cave centred around the "Vale Ganga", a natural waterfall that was integrated into the monument. The waterfall is visible from a rock carved balcony to the south and has been described as "falling over great Shiva's brow", particularly during monsoon season. The carvings in this cave are larger than life size but, according to author Dhavalikar, they are "corpulent, stumpy with disproportionate limbs" compared to those found in other Ellora caves.

=== Rameshwar temple, Cave 21 ===
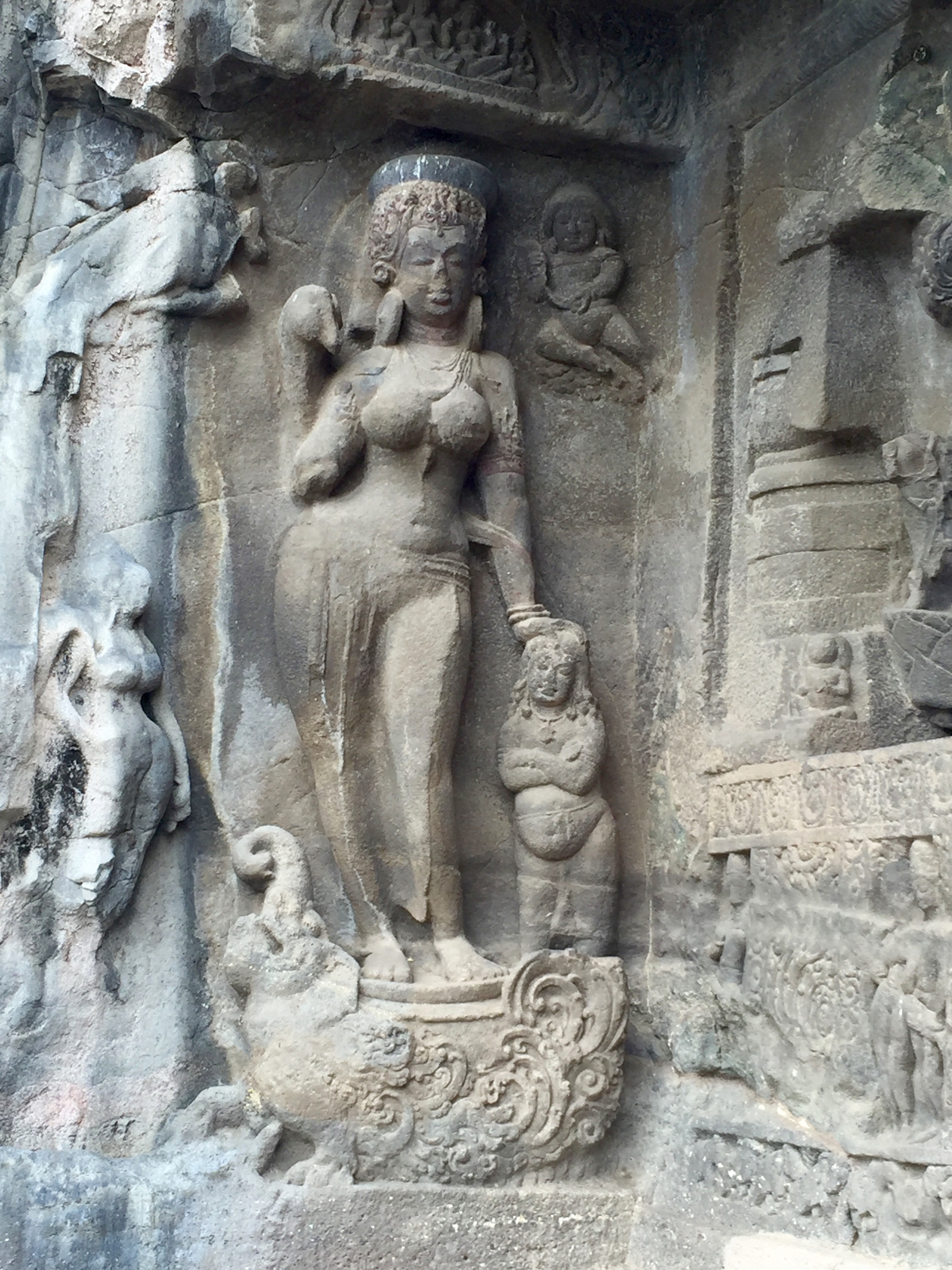
Goddess Ganga at the entrance of Cave 21

Cave 21, also called Rameshwar Lena, is another early excavation whose construction has been credited to the local dynasty of the Kalachuris of Mahishmati. The cave was completed prior to the ascension of Rashtrakuta dynasty which went on to expand the caves at Ellora.

Although the cave features similar works to those in other Ellora caves, it also has a number of unique pieces, such as those depicting the story of goddess Parvati's pursuit of Shiva. Carvings depicting Parvati and Shiva at leisure, Parvati's wedding to Shiva, Shiva dancing and Kartikeya (Skanda) have been found in other caves. The cave also features a large display of the Sapta Matrika, the seven mother goddesses of the Shakti tradition of Hinduism, flanked on either side by Ganesha and Shiva. Inside the temple are other goddesses important to Shakti tradition, for example, the Durga. The entrance to Cave 21 is flanked by large sculptures of the goddesses Ganga and Yamuna representing the two major Himalayan rivers and their significance to the Indian culture.

The cave is laid out symmetrically according to the mandapa square principle and has embedded geometric patterns repeated throughout the cave. The Shiva linga at the sanctum sanctorum of the temple is equidistant from the major statues of goddesses Ganga and Yamuna, with all three set in an equilateral triangle. According to Carmel Berkson, this layout likely symbolizes the Brahman–Prakriti relationship, the interdependence of the masculine and the feminine energies, that is central to Hindu theology.

=== The Kailasha temple: Cave 16 ===
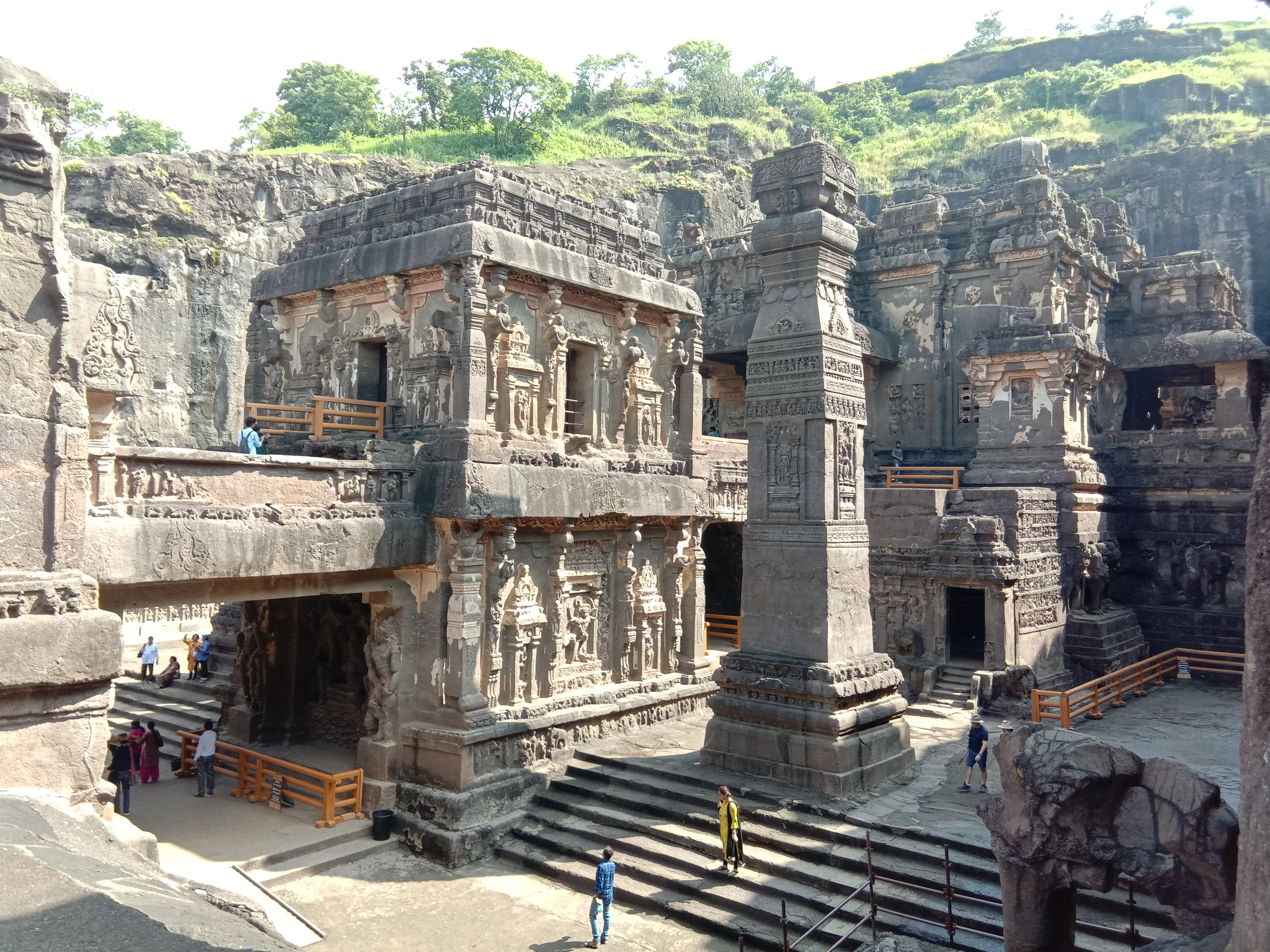
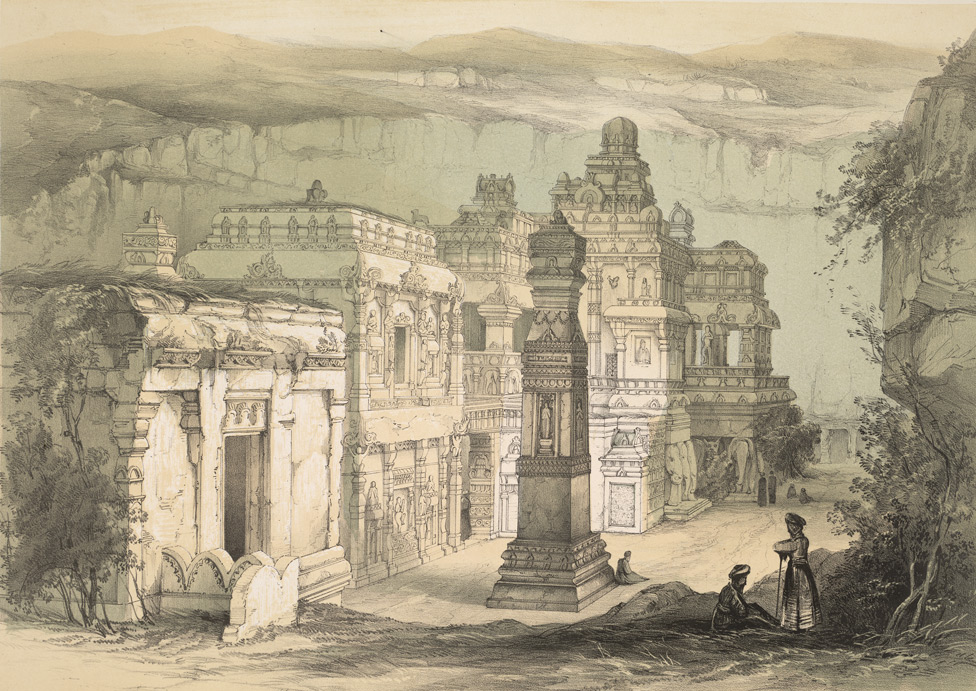
Kailash temple at Ellora. Right: James Fergusson's 19th-century drawing of the temple

Cave 16, known as the Kailas(h)a temple, is a particularly notable cave temple in India as a result of its size, architecture and having been entirely carved out of a single rock.

The Kailasha temple, inspired by Mount Kailasha, is dedicated to Shiva. It is modeled along similar lines to other Hindu temples with a gateway, an assembly hall, a multi-storey main temple surrounded by numerous shrines laid out according to the square principle, an integrated space for circumambulation, a garbha-griha (sanctum sanctorum) wherein resides the linga-yoni, and a spire-shaped like Mount Kailash – all carved from one rock. Other shrines carved from the same rock are dedicated to Ganga, Yamuna, Saraswati, the ten avatars of Vishnu, Vedic divinities including Indra, Agni, Vayu, Surya and Usha, as well as non-Vedic deities like Ganesha, Ardhanarishvara (half Shiva, half Parvati), Harihara (half Shiva, half Vishnu), Annapurna and Durga. The basement level of the temple features numerous Shaiva, Vaishnava and Shakti works; a notable set of carvings include the twelve episodes from the childhood of Krishna, an important element of Vaishnavism.

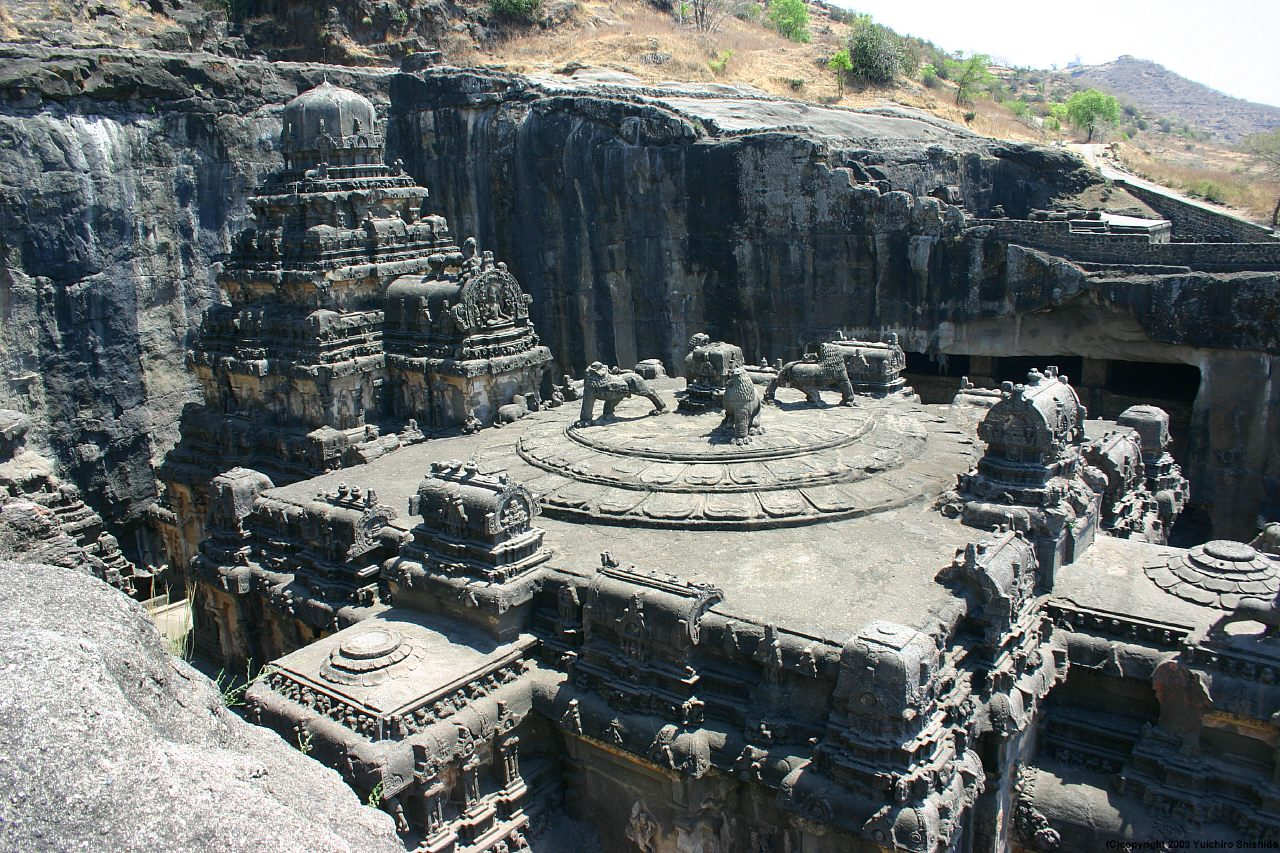
Kailasanatha temple, carved out of a single rock, was built by Rashtrakuta king Krishna I (r. 756–773 CE)

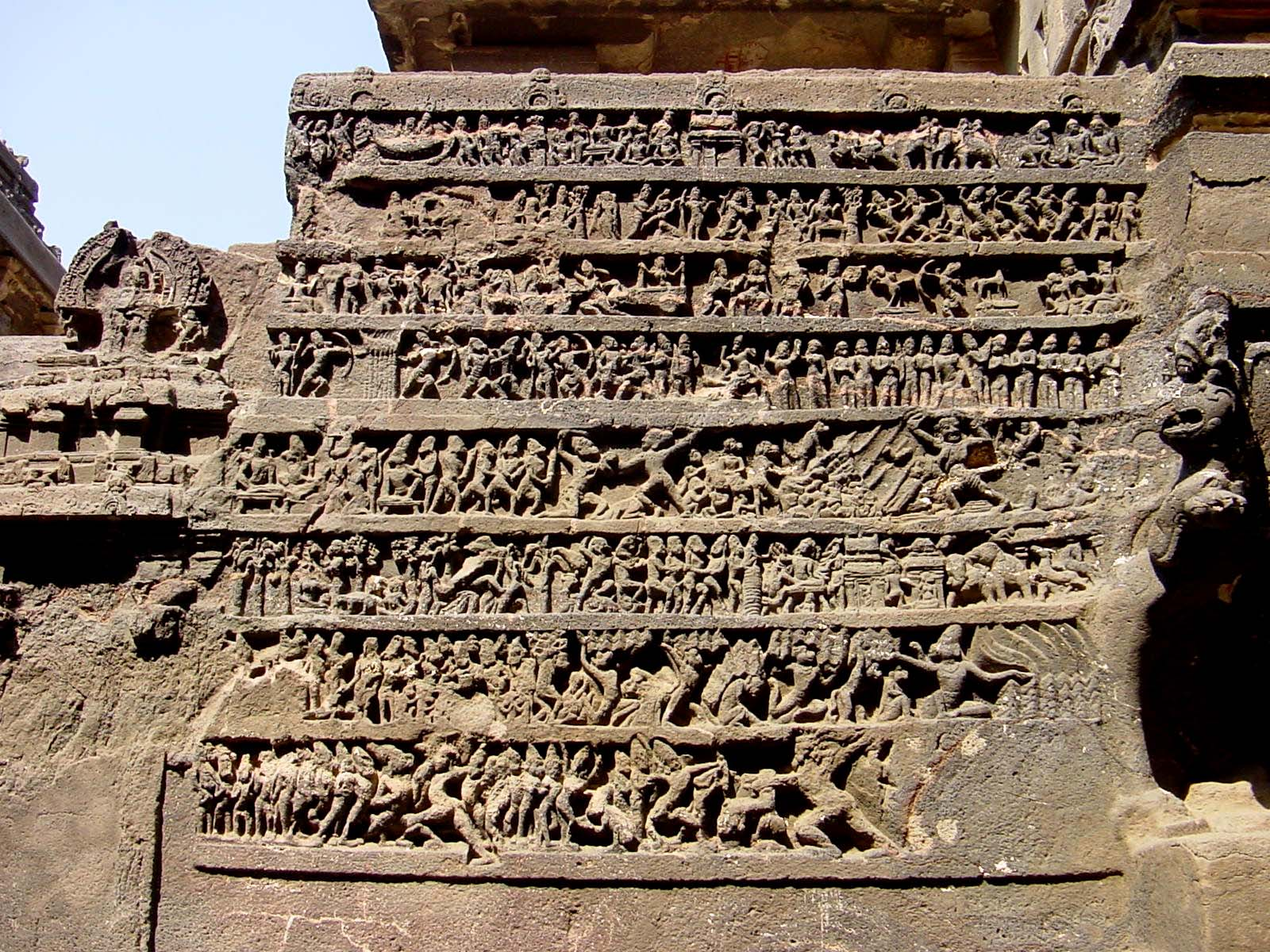
The Ramayana panel

The structure is a freestanding, multi-level temple complex covering an area twice the size of the Parthenon in Athens. It is estimated that the artists removed 3,000,000 cu ft (85,000 m^{3}) of stone, weighing approximately 200,000 t (220,000 tons), to excavate the temple.

The construction of the temple has been attributed to the Rashtrakuta king Krishna I (r. 756–773 CE), but elements of Pallava architecture have also been noted. The dimensions of the courtyard are 82 meters by 46 meters at the base, and 30 meters high (280 × 160 × 106 feet). The entrance features a low gopuram. The central shrine housing the lingam features a flat-roofed mandapa supported by 16 pillars, and a Dravidian shikhara. An image of Shiva's mount Nandi (the sacred bull) stands on a porch in front of the temple. Two of the walls in the main temple house rows of carvings depicting the Mahabharata, along the north side, and the Ramayana, on the south side.

The Kailasha temple is considered a highly notable example of temple construction from 1st millennium Indian history, and was called, by Carmel Berkson, "a wonder of the world" among rock-cut monuments.

=== The Dashavatara: Cave 15 ===
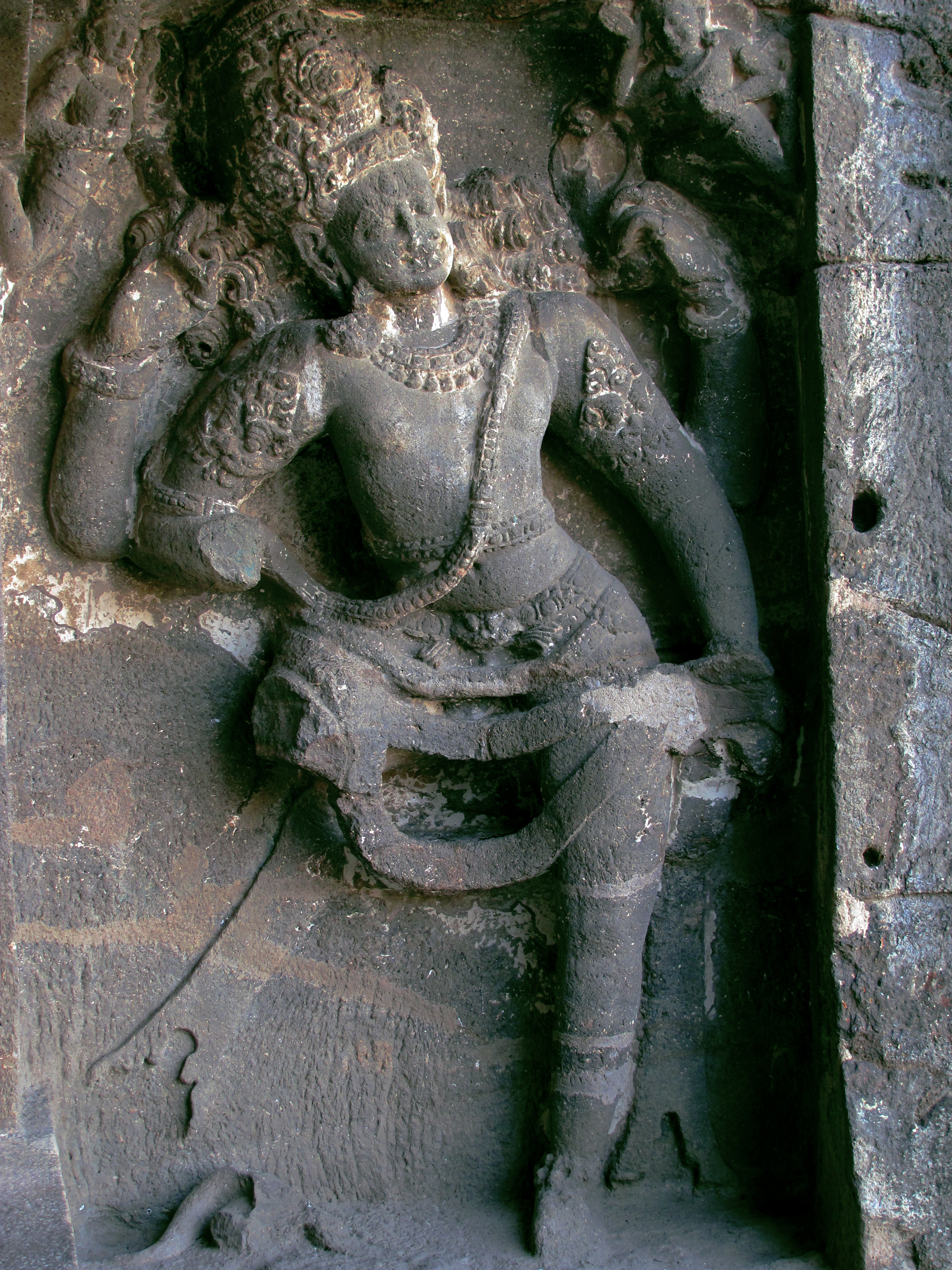
Vishnu at the Dashavatara Ellora temple

The Dashavatara temple, or Cave 15, is another significant excavation that was completed sometime after Cave 14 (Ravan ki Khai, Hindu). Cave 15 has cells and a layout plan that are similar to Buddhist Caves 11 and 12, which suggests this cave was intended to be a Buddhist cave; however, the presence of non-Buddhist features, such as a Nrtya Mandapa (an Indian classical dance pavilion) at its entrance, indicated otherwise. According to James Harle, Hindu images have been found in Buddhist Cave 11, while many Hindu deities have been incorporated in Buddhist caves of the region. This overlap in disparate designs between Buddhist and Hindu caves may be due to the sites being worked on by the same architects and workers, or perhaps a planned Buddhist cave was adapted into a Hindu monument.

According to Geri Malandra, Ellora was an established Brahmanical Tirtha (prayer and pilgrimage site) prior to the arrival of Buddhist practitioners circa 600 CE. While the Buddhist caves lack any inscriptions indicating royal patronage, the caves “…[embody] considerable, significant change. It appears to be on a kind of boundary where transitions in iconography, and then style, occurred. At Ellora we see the culmination of a millennium-long tradition of rock-cut Buddhist architecture in India” (pg. 194)

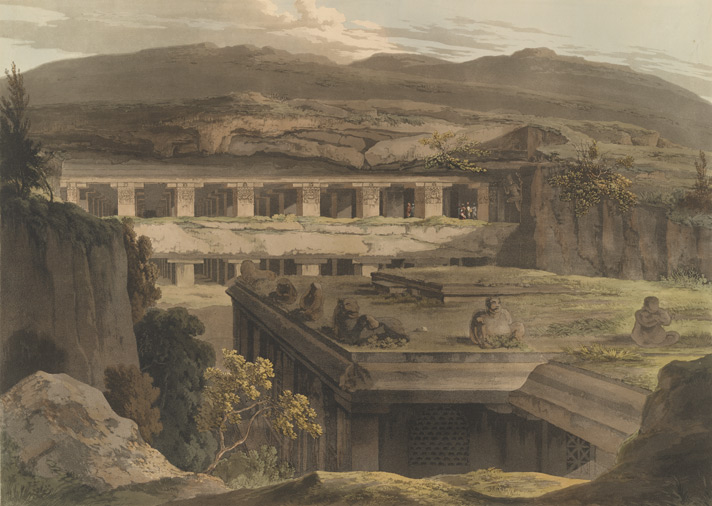
An early 19th-century painting of Cave 15

The Hindu temple housed in Cave 15 has an open court with a free-standing monolithic mandapa at the middle and a two-storeyed excavated temple at the rear. Large sculptural panels between the wall columns on the upper floor illustrate a wide range of themes, including the ten avatars of Vishnu. An inscription of Dantidurga, critical to establishing the age of the temple, is on the back wall of the front mandapa. According to Coomaraswamy, the finest relief of this cave is the one depicting the death of Hiranyakashipu, where Vishnu in man-lion (Narasimha) form, emerges from a pillar to lay a fatal hand upon his shoulder. It is a Rastrakoot dynasty sculpture. Other reliefs in Cave 15 include the Gangadhara, marriage of Shiva and Parvati, Tripurantika of Shakti tradition, Markendeya, Garuda, aspects of life, Nandi in mandapa, dancing Shiva, Andhakasura, Govardhanadhari and Gajendravarada. The panels are arranged in dyads, which states Carmel Berkson, reinforce each other by displaying "cooperative but also antagonistic energy" with a mutuality of power transference.

=== Other Hindu caves ===
Other notable Hindu caves are the Ravan ki Khai (Cave 14) and the Nilkantha (Cave 22), both of which house numerous sculptures, Cave 25 in particular features a carving of Surya in its ceiling.

== The Jain monuments: Caves 30–34 ==
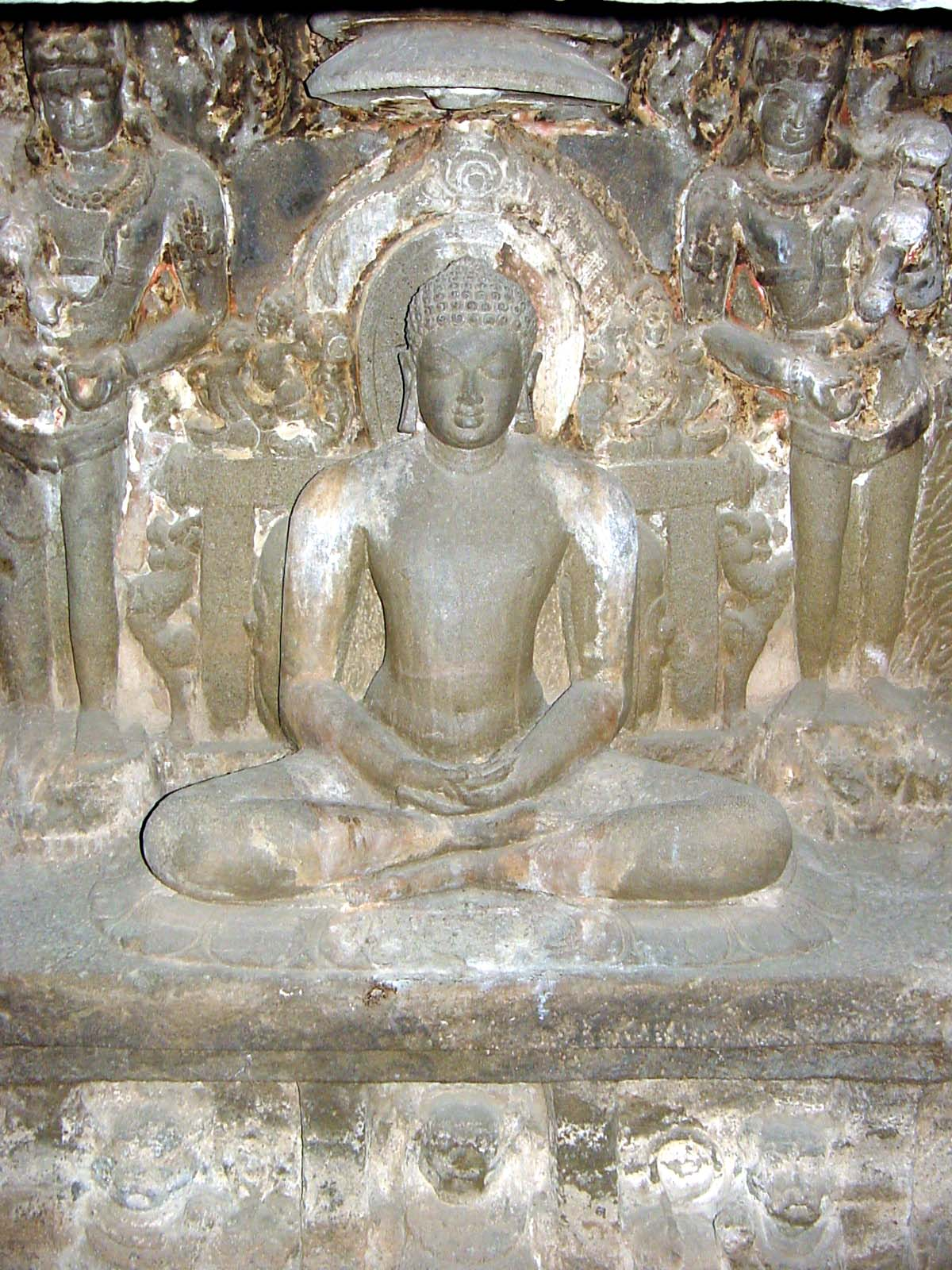
Mahavira

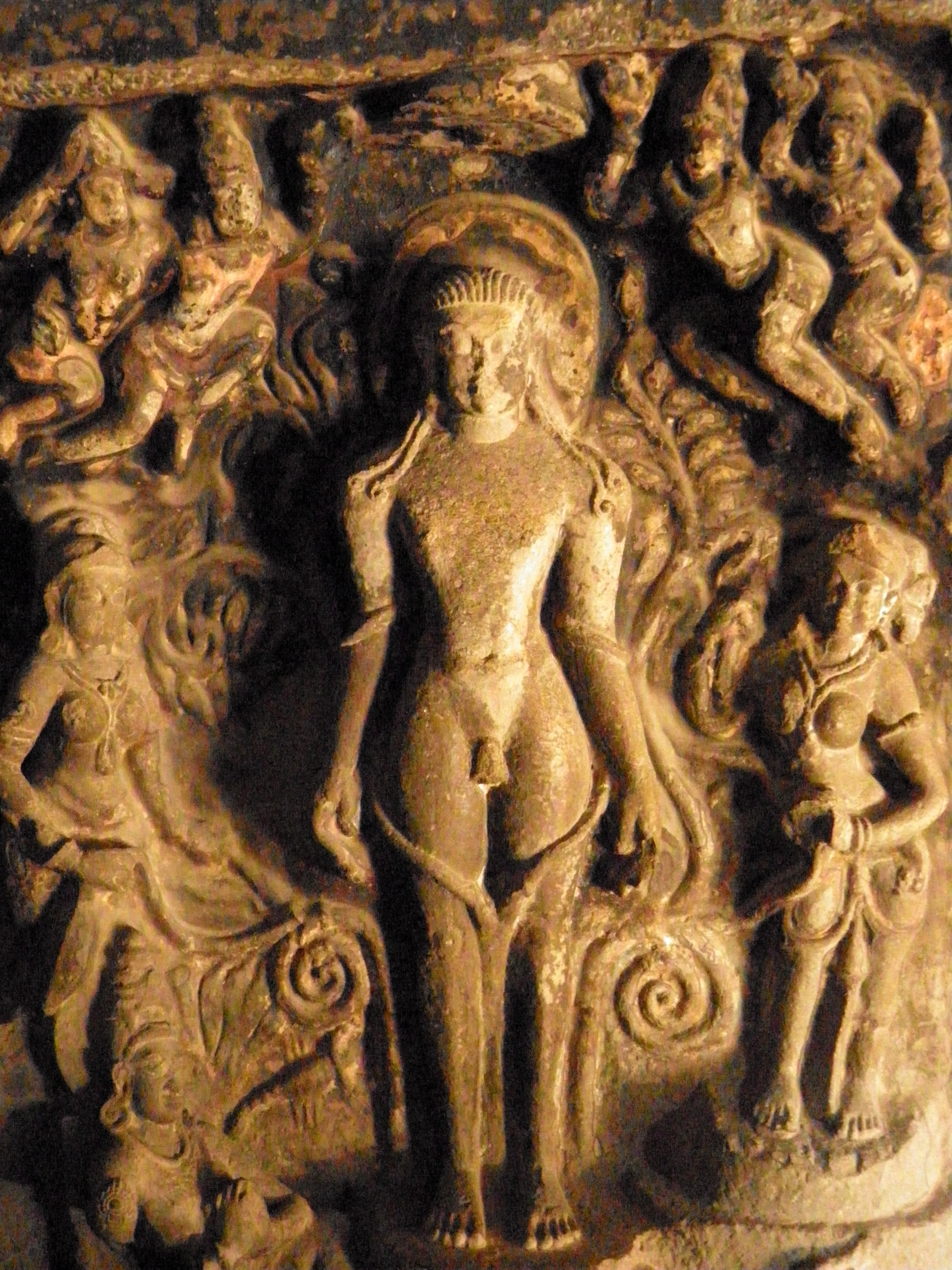
Bahubali

At the north end of Ellora are the five Jain caves belonging to the Digambara sect, which were excavated in the ninth and early tenth centuries. These caves are smaller than the Buddhist and Hindu caves but nonetheless feature highly detailed carvings. They, and the later-era Hindu caves, were built at a similar time and both share architectural and devotional ideas such as a pillared veranda, symmetric mandapa and puja (worship). However, unlike the Hindu temples, emphasis is placed on the depiction of the twenty-four tirthankaras (spiritual conquerors who have gained liberation from the endless cycle of rebirths). In addition to these Jinas, the works at the Jain temples include carvings of gods and goddesses, yaksha (male nature deity), yakshi (female nature deity) and human devotees prevalent in Jain mythology of 1st millennium CE.

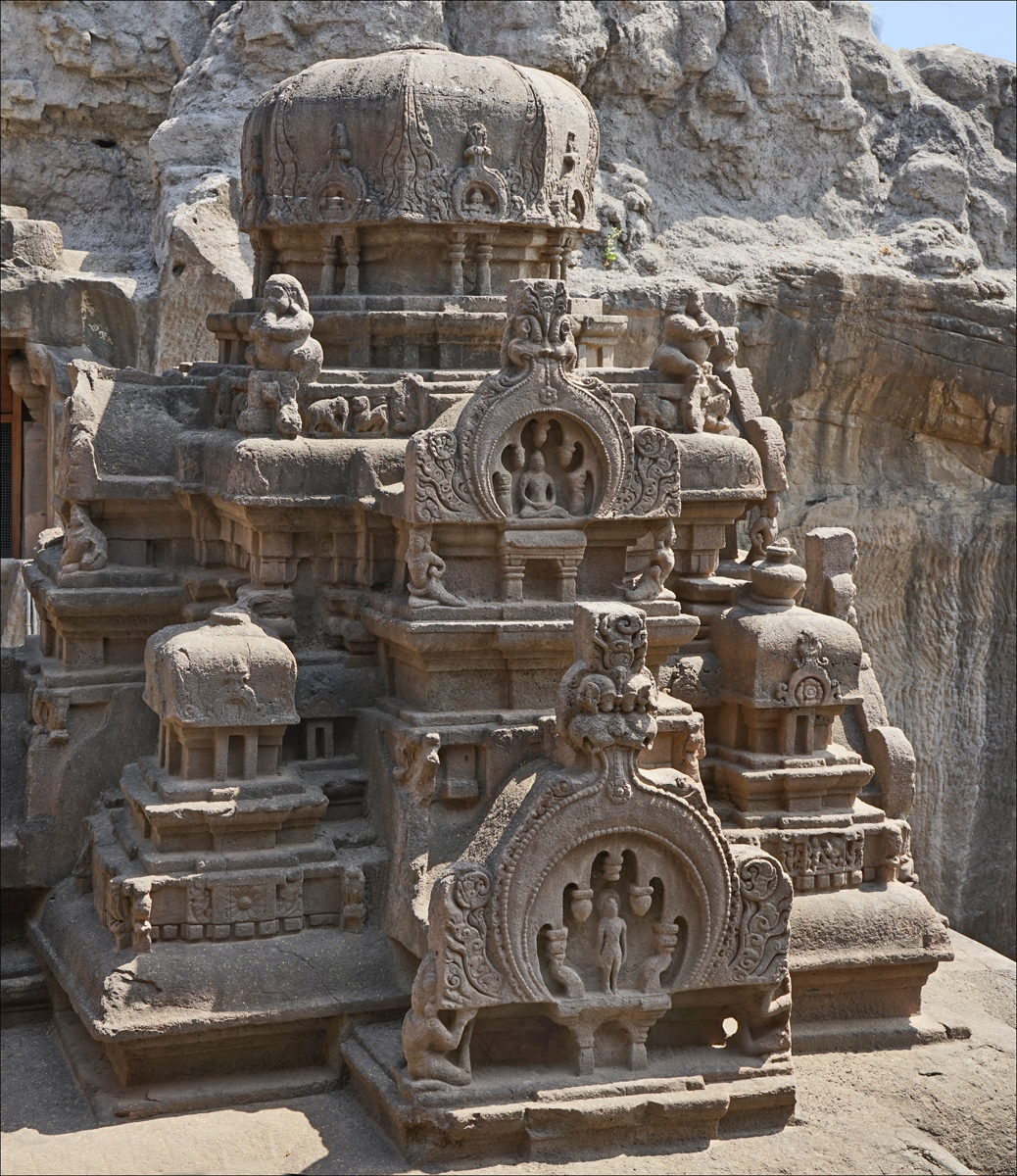
Shikhar of Indra Sabha

According to José Pereira, the five caves were actually 23 distinct excavations, over different periods. Thirteen of these are in Indra Sabha, 6 in Jagannatha Sabha, and rest in the Chhota Kailash. Pereira used numerous sources to conclude that the creation of the Jain caves at Ellora likely began in the late 8th century, with construction and excavation activity extending beyond the 10th century and into the 13th century before coming to a halt with the invasion of the region by the Delhi Sultanate. This is evidenced by votive inscriptions dated to 1235 CE, where the donor states to have "converted Charanadri into a holy tirtha" for Jains by gifting the excavation of lordly Jinas.

Particularly important Jain shrines are the Chhota Kailash (cave 30, 4 excavations), the Indra Sabha (cave 32, 13 excavations) and the Jagannath Sabha (cave 33, 4 excavations); cave 31 is an unfinished four-pillared hall and shrine. Cave 34 is a small cave, which can be accessed through an opening in the left side of Cave 33.

The Jain caves contain some of the earliest Samavasarana images among its devotional carvings. The Samavasarana is of particular importance to Jains being the hall where the Tirthankara preaches after attaining Kevala Jnana (liberating omniscience). Another interesting feature found in these caves is the pairing of sacred figures in Jainism, specifically Parsvanatha and Bahubali, which appear 19 times. Other artworks of significance include those of deities Sarasvati, Sri, Saudharmendra (Indra), Sarvanubhuti, Gomukha, Ambika, Chakreshvari, Padmavati, Ksetrapala and Hanuman.

=== Chhota Kailasha: Cave 30 ===
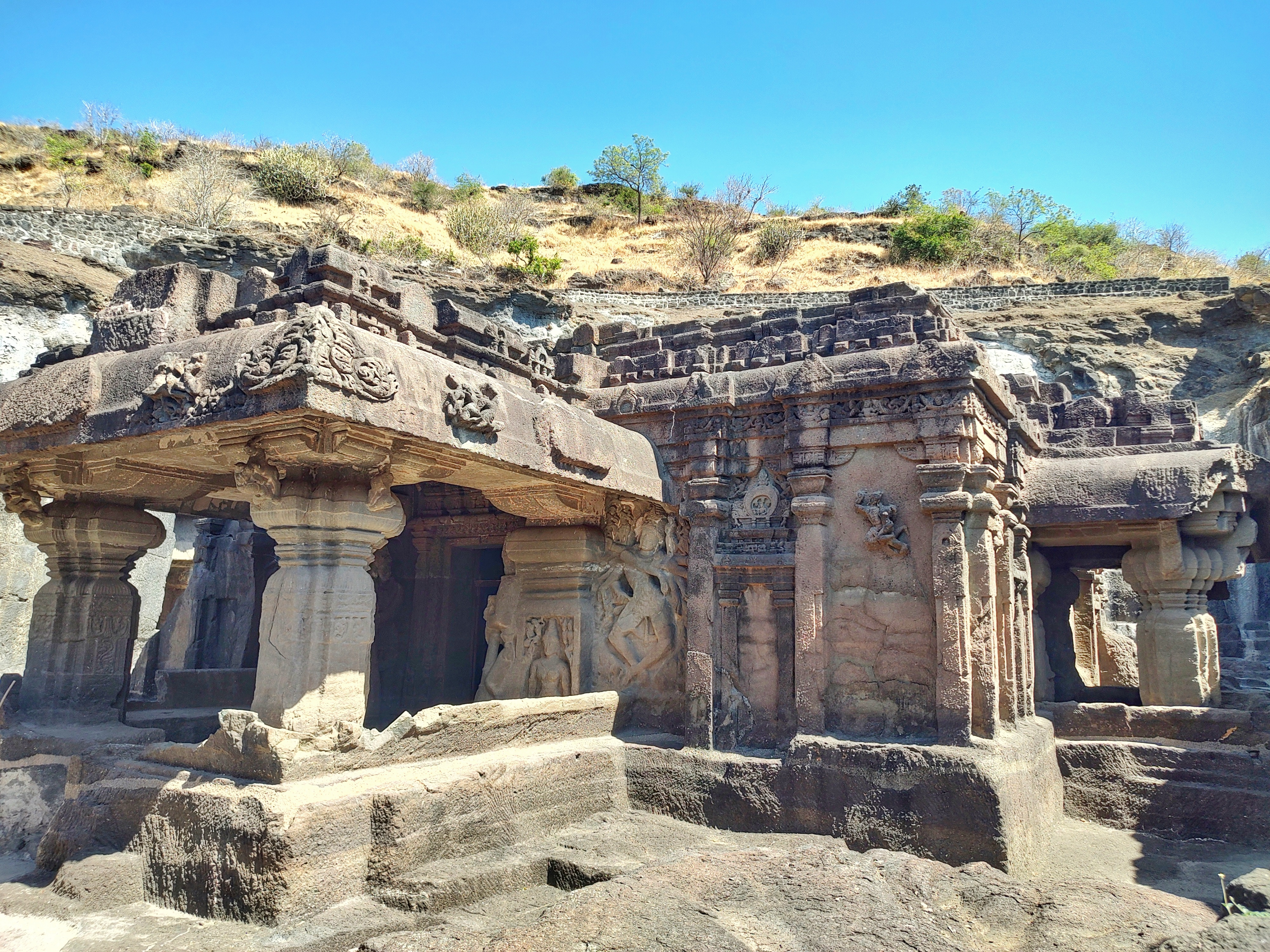
Chhota Kailasha

The Chhota Kailasha, or the little Kailasha, is so named due to the similarity of the carvings to those in the Kailasha temple. This temple was likely built in the early 9th century, concurrent with the construction of the lower level of the Indra Sabha, some decades after the completion of the Kailasha Temple. It features two larger-than-life size reliefs of dancing Indra, one with eight arms and another with twelve, both adorned with ornaments and a crown; Indra's arms are shown in various mudra reminiscent of the dancing Shiva artworks found in nearby Hindu caves. However, the iconography has several differences that indicate this cave shows a dancing Indra and not a dancing Shiva. The Indra panels at the entrance also feature other deities, celestials, musicians and dancers.

Art historian Lisa Owen has raised questions concerning whether music and dance were part of 9th-century Jainism, given that Jain theology focuses on meditative asceticism. Rajan, for example, has proposed that Cave 30 May have originally been a Hindu monument that was later converted into a Jain temple. However, Owen suggests that the celebration-filled artwork in this temple is better understood as part of the Samavasarana doctrine in Jainism.

The overlap between Jain and Hindu mythologies has caused confusion, given Book Three of the Hindu Mahabharata describes Indra's abode as one filled with a variety of heroes, courtesans, and artisans, within a paradise-like setting. This imagery is repeated throughout Cave 30, similar to the Hindu caves, setting the context of the temple. However, the symbolism closer to the centre of the temple is more aligned with the core ideas of Jainism: a greater prevalence of meditating images and Jinas, the place where the Jain devotee would perform his or her ritual abhisheka (worship).

=== Cave 31 ===
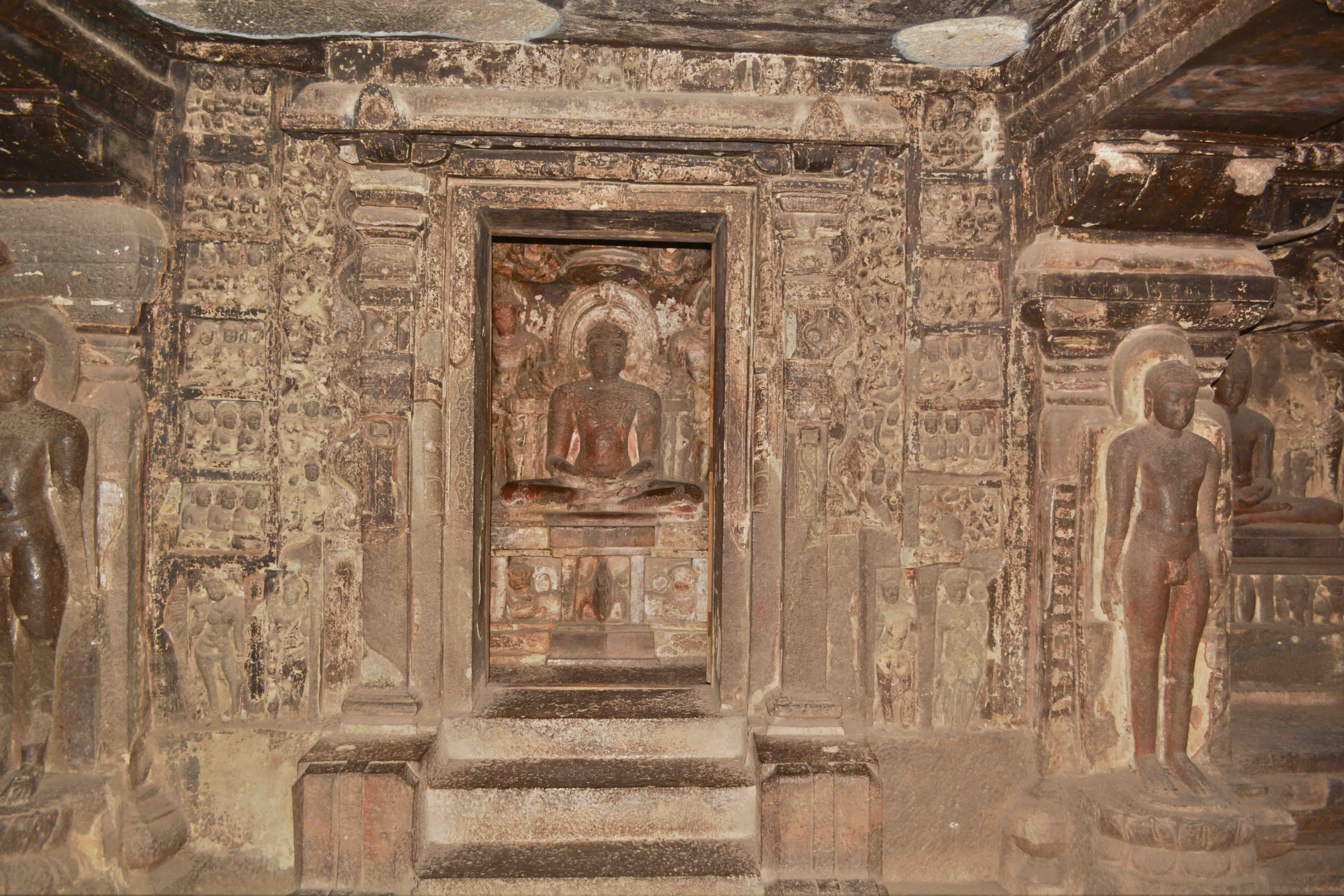
Mahavira with yaksha Matanga and yakshi Siddhaiki

Cave 31, consisting of four pillars, a small shrine a number of carvings, was not completed. Carvings of Parshvanatha, guarded by yaksha Dharanendra with his 7 hoods, and Bahubali were made into the left and right walls of the hall, respectively, while within the shrine resides an idol of Mahavira. The idol is seated in a padmasan position on a lion-throne and a chakra is seen in the middle panel of the throne. The figure of yaksha Matanga on an elephant is on the left side of shrine while one of yakshi Siddhaiki, seated in savya-lalitasana on a lion with a child on her lap, is on the right.

=== The Indra Sabha: Cave 32 ===
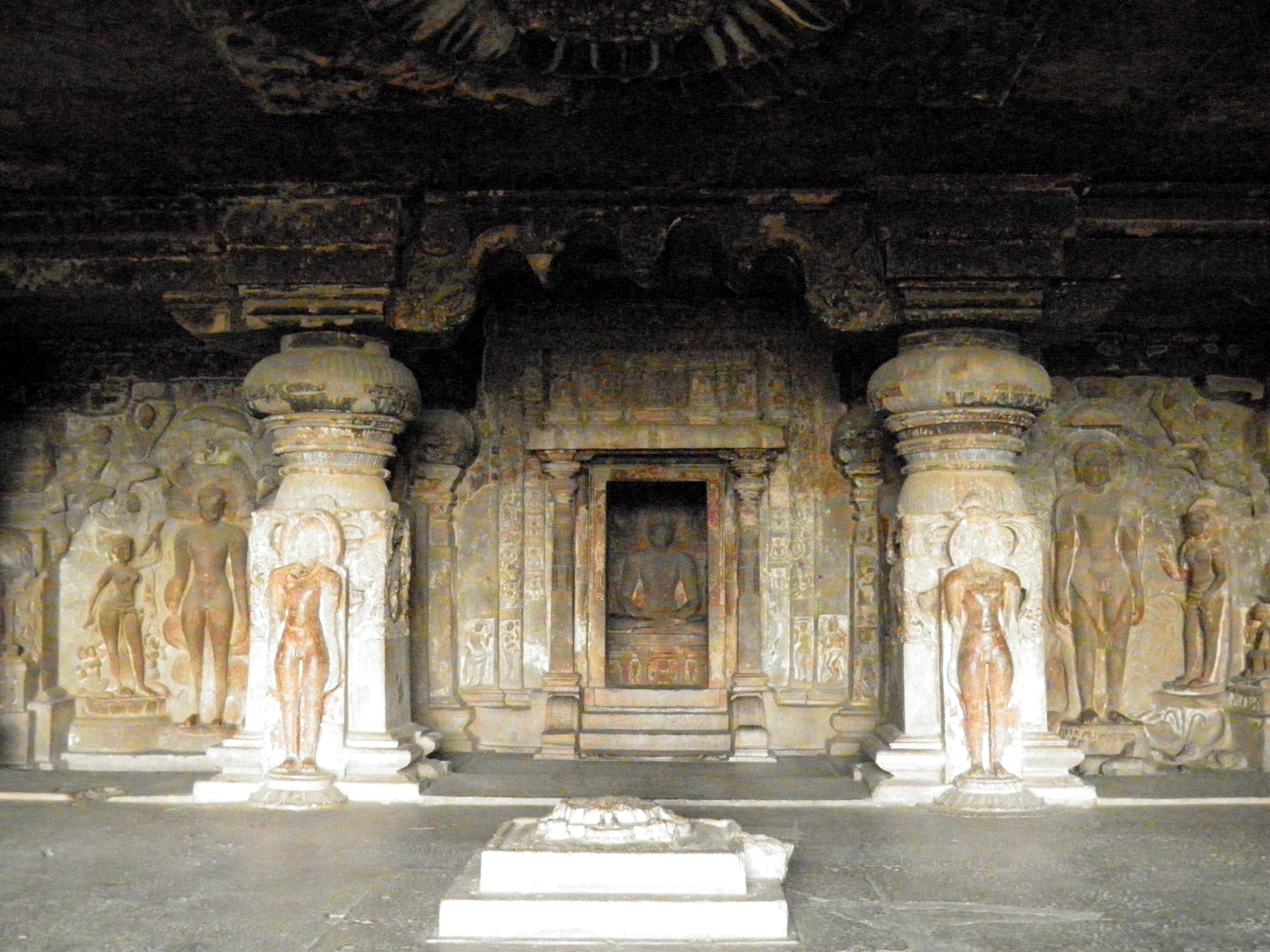
Indra Sabha is the largest of the Jain series and dates from the 9th century, Rashtrakuta patronage. A simple gateway leads to a courtyard in which there is a monolithic shrine with a pyramidal roof. The double-storey temple is excavated in the rear of the courtyard. The interior of the cave has a columned mandapa or hall with niches on the three sides and the sanctuary in the middle of the back wall. Carved figures of the Jain Tirthankharas decorate the walls.

The Indra Sabha (Cave 32), excavated in the 9th century, is a two-storey cave with a monolithic shrine in its court. 19th-century historians confused the Jain yakshas for alternate images of Indra that were found in Buddhist and Hindu artworks, thus leading to the temple being given the misnomer "Indra Sabha". Indra is an important deity in all three major religions, but is of particular importance in Jainism as not only is he one of 64 deities who reign over the heavens, but he is also, specifically, the king of the first Jain heaven, Saudharmakalpa, and the chief architect of the celestial assembly hall according to the Adipurana, a Jain holy text.

The Indra Sabha Jain temple is historically significant as it contains evidence, in the form of layered deposits and textual records, of active worship inside by the Jain community. In particular, rituals were known to have been held in the upper level, where the artwork may have played a central role.

As with many caves in Ellora, numerous carvings adorn the temple, such as those of the lotus flower on the ceiling. On the upper level of the shrine, excavated at the rear of the court, is an image of Ambika, the yakshi of Neminath, seated on her lion under a mango tree, laden with fruit. The centre of the shrine presents Sarvatobhadra, where four tirthankaras of Jainism – Rishabhanatha (1st), Neminatha (22nd), Parshvanatha (23rd) and Mahavira (24th) are aligned to the cardinal directions, forming a place of worship for devotees.

=== The Jagannatha Sabha: Cave 33 ===
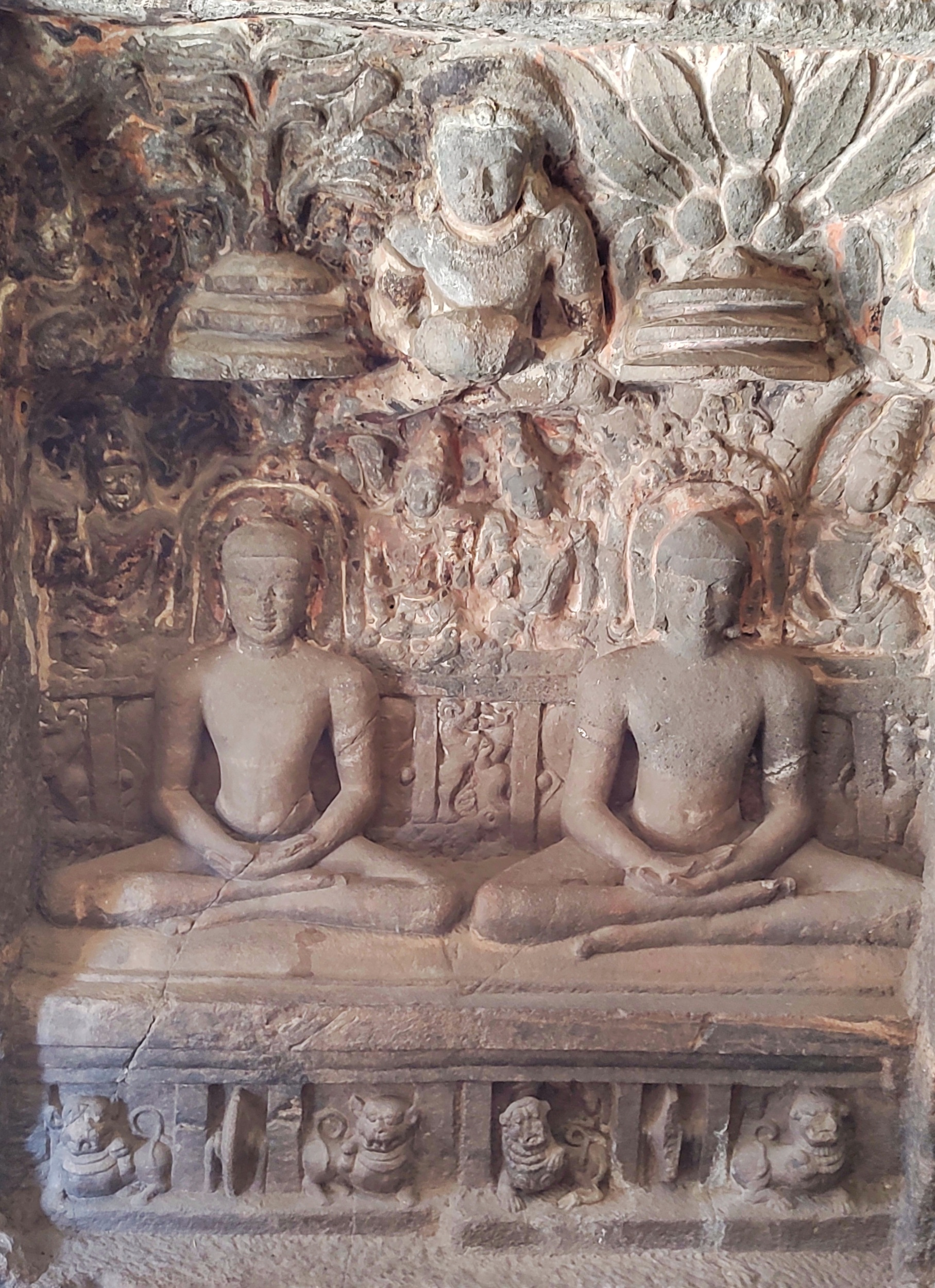
Seated Jinas

The Jagannatha Sabha (Cave 33) is the second-largest Jain cave at Ellora and dates to the 9th century according to the inscriptions on the pillars. It is a two-storeyed cave with twelve massive pillars and elephant heads projecting towards a porch, all carved from a single rock. The hall has two heavy square pillars in front, four in the middle area, and a pillared interior square principal hall with fluted shafts, all intricately carved with capitals, ridges and brackets. Inside the major idols are of Parshvanatha and Mahavira, the last two tirthankaras in Jainism.

=== Cave 34 ===
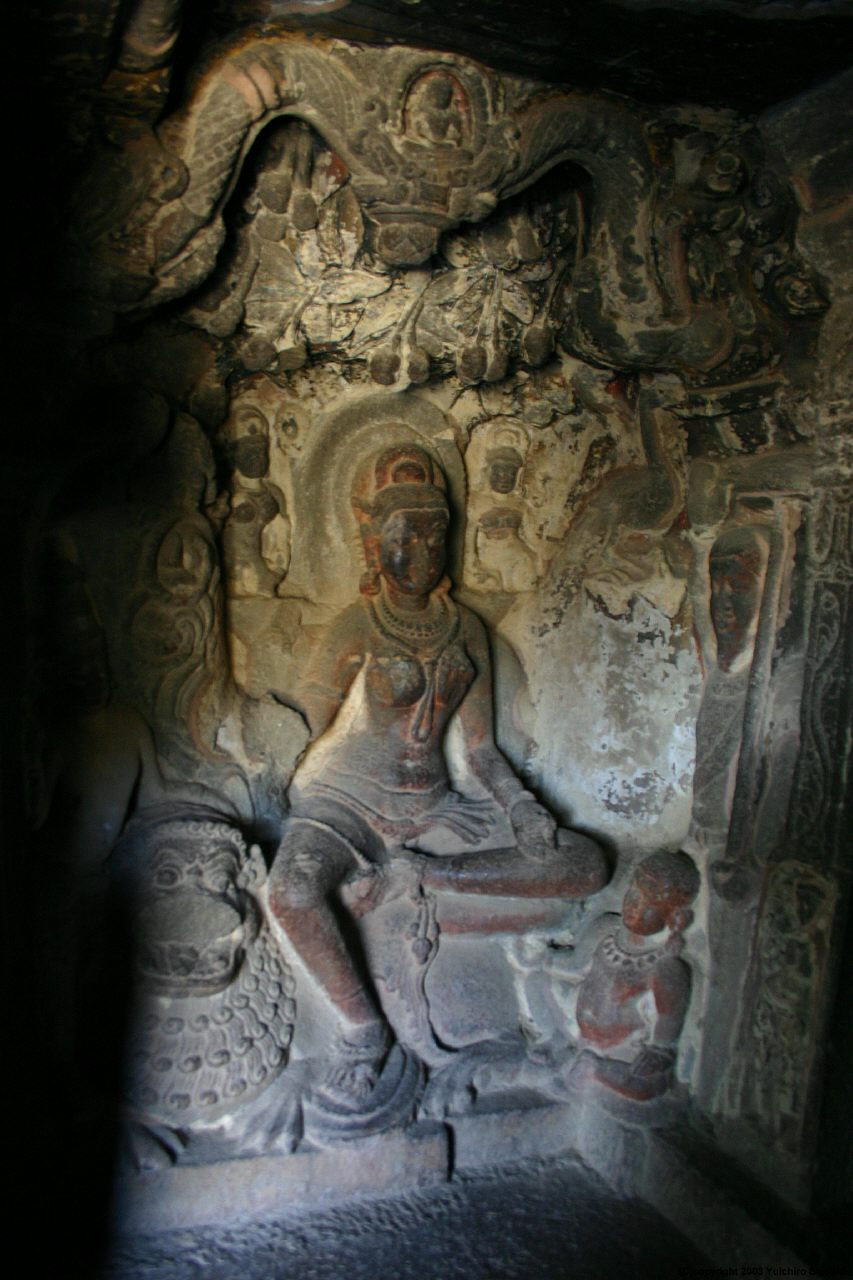
Goddess Ambika sitting on a lion, Cave 34

Certain inscriptions in Cave 34, or J26 according to historian José Pereira, are not deciphered as yet but were likely to have been executed between 800 and 850 CE. Other inscriptions, such as the one by Sri Nagavarma, are thought to date from the 9th or 10th century.

This cave features a large seated Parshvanatha with four camara attendants, two of whom hold fly-whisks and seemingly emerge from the back of the Jina's throne. As with many other Jain excavations, a large pair of yaksha-yakshi are also found in this cave near the Jina. In the back of the cave is a bearded figure with a bowl containing round sacrificial offerings, which have shapes reminiscent of pindas (rice balls) or laddus (sweetmeat). This suggests the scene may be related to Jain devotional worship, possibly a shraddha ceremony. The Parshvanatha in the cave is paired with a standing Bahubali, and accompanied by other carvings showing musicians playing a variety of instruments such as horns, drums, conchs, trumpets, and cymbals. A particularly notable feature of the cave is a giant, open lotus carving on its ceiling and rooftop, which is found in only one other Jain excavation and one Hindu Cave 25 in all of Ellora. The placement of the lotus on the cave rather than a sculpture symbolizes that the temple is a divine place.

=== Rock carved image of Parshvanatha ===
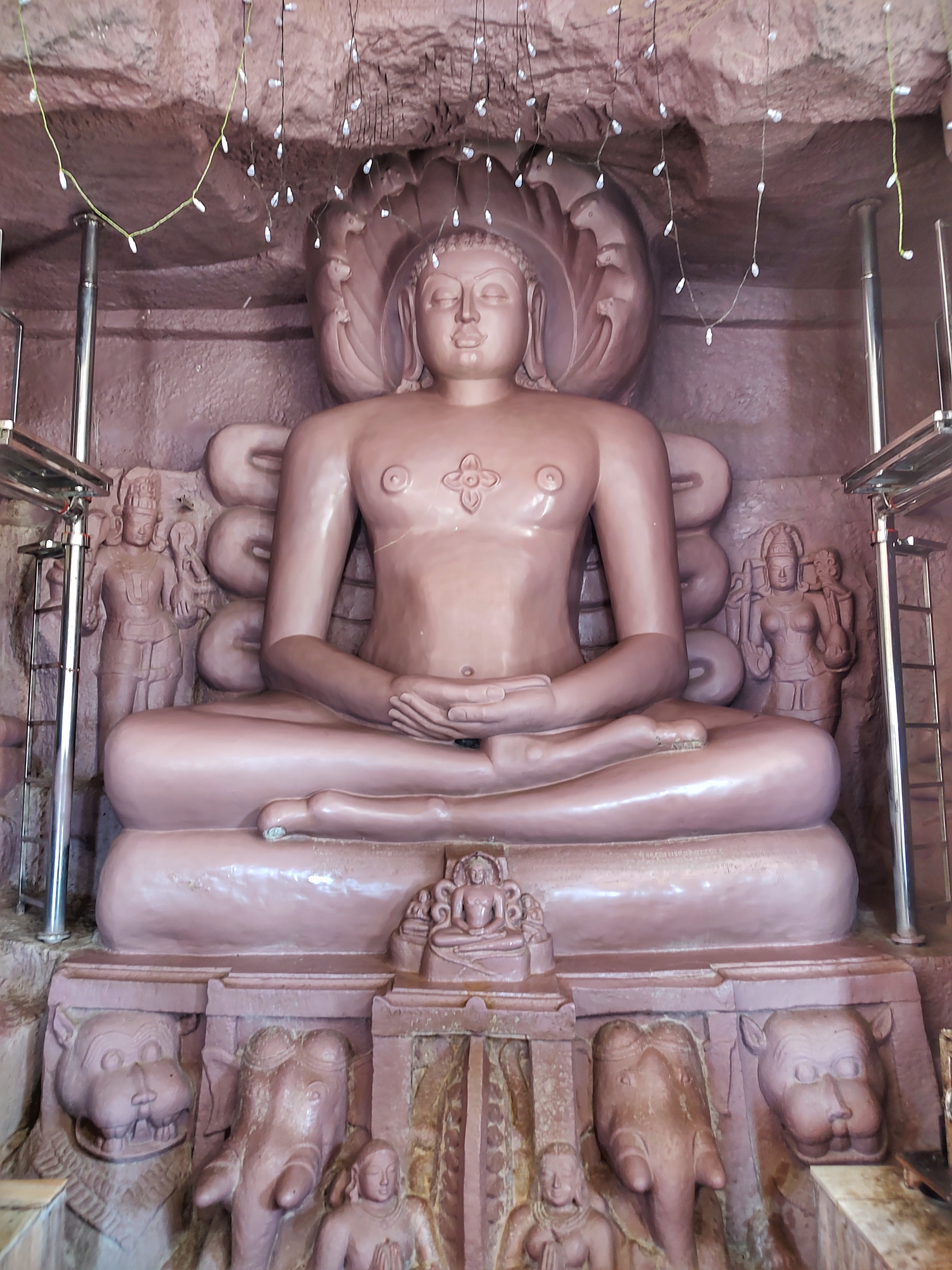
4.9 m (16 ft) rock-carved image of Lord Parshvanatha

On the hill to the northeast of the main complex of caves is a Jain temple containing a 4.9 m (16 ft) rock-carved image of Parshvanatha from the Rashtrakuta period with an inscription dated AD 1234. The well-preserved image is flanked by Dharaıendra and Padmavati. The inscription mentions the site as Charana Hill, a holy site. It is still in active worship and thus not protected by the ASI. Six hundred steps must be climbed to reach it. It is managed by a Jain Gurukul in the village.

== Visitors, desecration and damage ==
There have been several records written in the centuries following their completion indicating that these caves were visited regularly, particularly as it was within sight of a trade route. For example, Ellora was known to have been frequented by Buddhist monks in the 9th and 10th centuries. It is mistakenly referred to by the 10th-century Baghdad resident Al-Masudi as Aladra, site of a great temple, a place of Indian pilgrimage and one with thousands of cells where devotees live; in 1352 CE, the records of Ala-ud-Din Bahman Shah mention him camping at the site. Other records were written by Firishta, Thevenot (1633–67), Niccolao Manucci (1653–1708), Charles Warre Malet (1794), and Seely (1824). Some accounts acknowledge the importance of Ellora but make inaccurate statements regarding its construction; for example, a description of the caves by Venetian traveller Niccolao Manucci, whose Mughal history was well received in France, wrote that the Ellora caves "...were executed by the ancient Chinese" based on his assessment of the workmanship and what he had been told. Ellora was a well-known site in Mughal times: the emperor Aurangzeb used to picnic there with his family, as did other Mughal nobles. Mustaid Khan, a courtier of Aurangzeb, stated that people visited the area in all seasons but especially during the monsoon. He also spoke of "many kinds of images with lifelike forms" carved on all the ceilings and walls, but noted that the monuments themselves were in a state of "desolation in spite of its strong foundations." Contrary to later oral histories, there is no historical record of Aurangzeb attempting to destroy the Kailashanatha temple at Ellora.

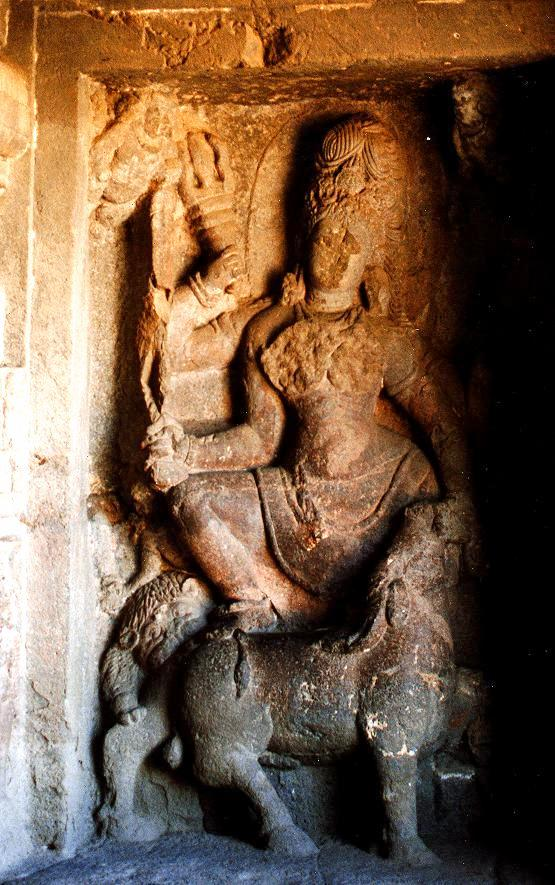
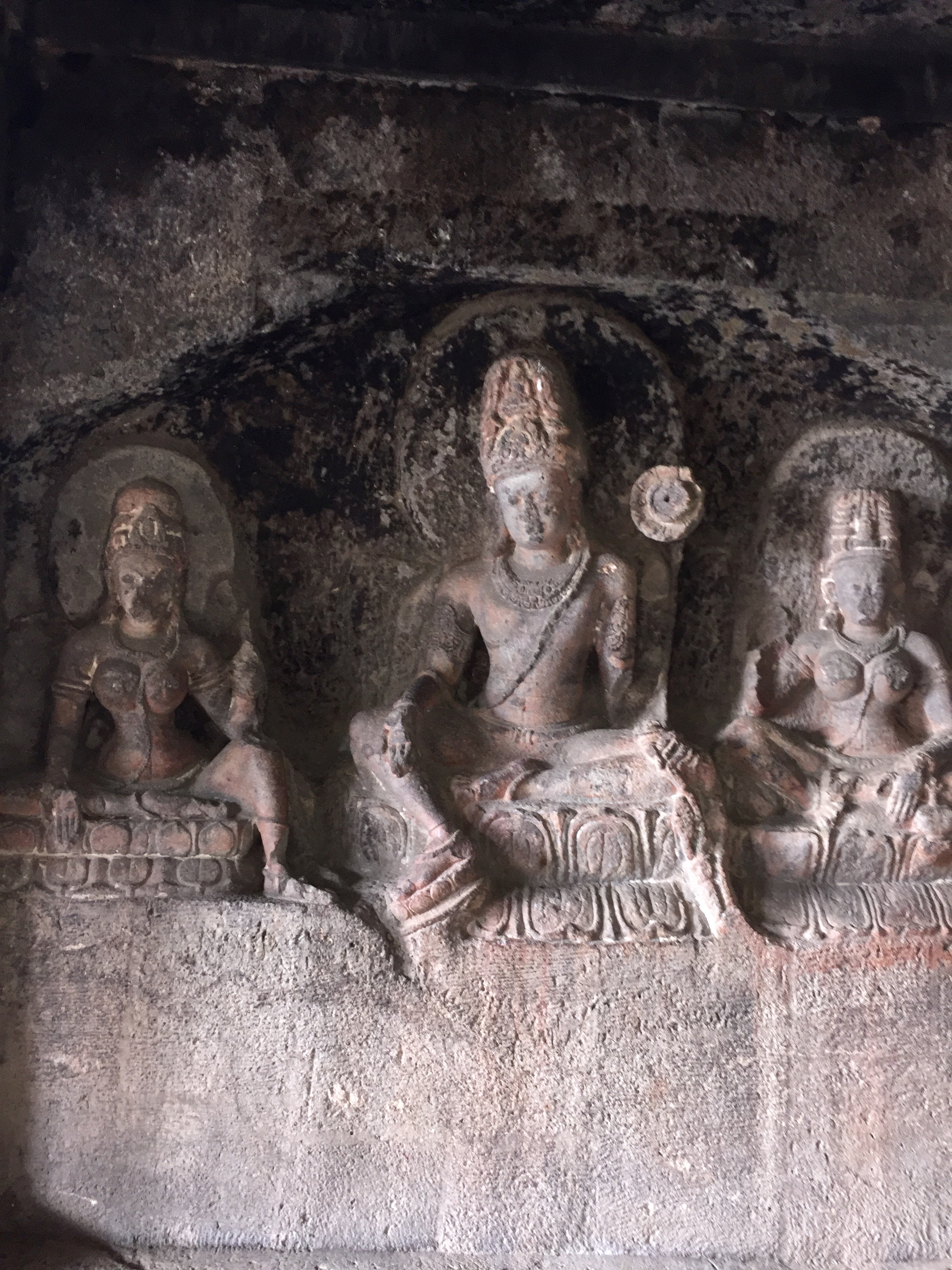
Typical damage to idols centres around the face, nose, breasts, and limbs. Desecrated statues in a Hindu Cave (left) and a Buddhist Cave.

The Lilacharitra, a Marathi text dated to the late 13th century CE, is the first report stating that active use of Ellora ceased in the 13th century. Islamic court records indicated that Deogiri, the capital of the Yadava dynasty, and about 10 kilometres from Ellora, had come under sustained attack during this period and subsequently fell to the Delhi Sultanate in 1294 CE. According to José Pereira, there is evidence that work in the Jain caves at Ellora had flourished under Singhana, who ruled the Yadava dynasty between ~1200 and 1247 CE, and these caves were in use by Jain visitors and worshippers into the 13th century. However, Jain religious activity ceased after the region came under Islamic rule in the late 13th century.

The Buddhist, Hindu, and Jain monuments at Ellora show substantial damage, particularly to the idols, whereas intricate carvings on the pillars, and of natural objects on the walls, remain intact. The desecration of idols and images was traced to the 15th to 17th centuries when this region of the Deccan peninsula was subjected to iconoclasm by Muslim armies. According to Geri Malandra, such devastation by Muslims stemmed from the perceived offense caused by "the graphic, anthropomorphic imagery of Hindu and Buddhist shrines". Muslim historians of the Islamic Sultanate period mention Ellora in their descriptions of the widespread damage and fanatical destruction of idols and artwork of the region, with some Muslims of this era being known to have expressed concern regarding the wanton damage and "deplored it as a violation of beauty", according to Carl Ernst.

== Ellora inscriptions ==
Several inscriptions at Ellora date from the 6th century onwards, the best known of which is an inscription by Rashtrakuta Dantidurga (c. 753–757 CE) on the back wall of the front mandapa of Cave 15 stating that he had offered prayers at that temple. Jagannatha Sabha, Jain cave 33, has 3 inscriptions that give the names of monks and donors, while a Parshvanath temple on the hill has a 1247 CE inscription that gives the name of a donor from Vardhanapura.

The Great Kailasa temple (Cave 16) is attributed to Krishna I (c. 757–783 CE), the successor and uncle of Dantidurga. A copper plate inscription from 812 CE, found in Baroda, Gujarat, states that a great edifice was built on a hill by Krishnaraja at Ellora: "The architect builder of which (...) was himself suddenly struck with astonishment, saying 'Oh, how was it that I built it!'"

== Painted carvings and paintings ==
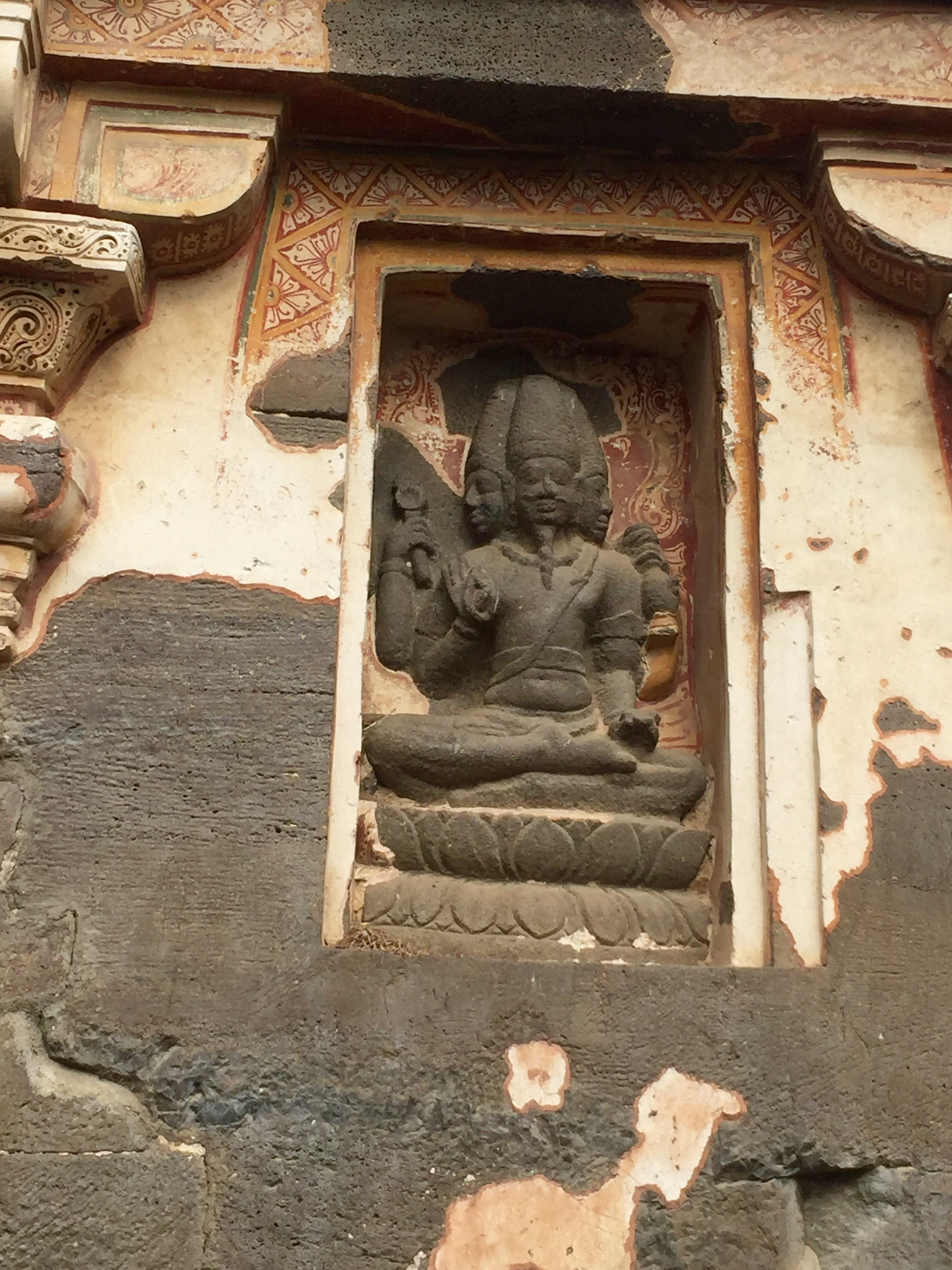
Brahma at Kailasha temple of Ellora, with painted decorations

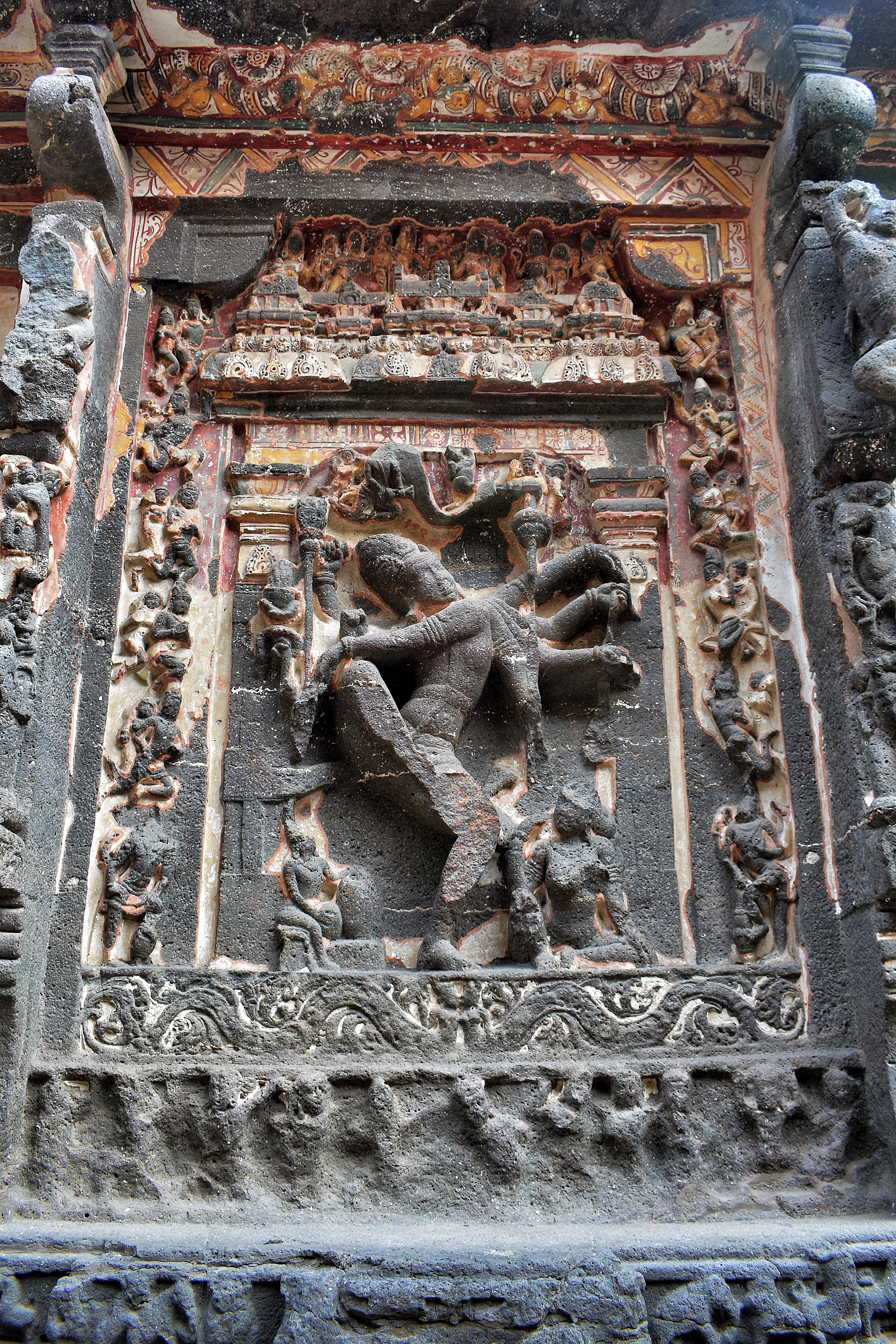
Cave 16 (6), surviving plaster and painted artwork

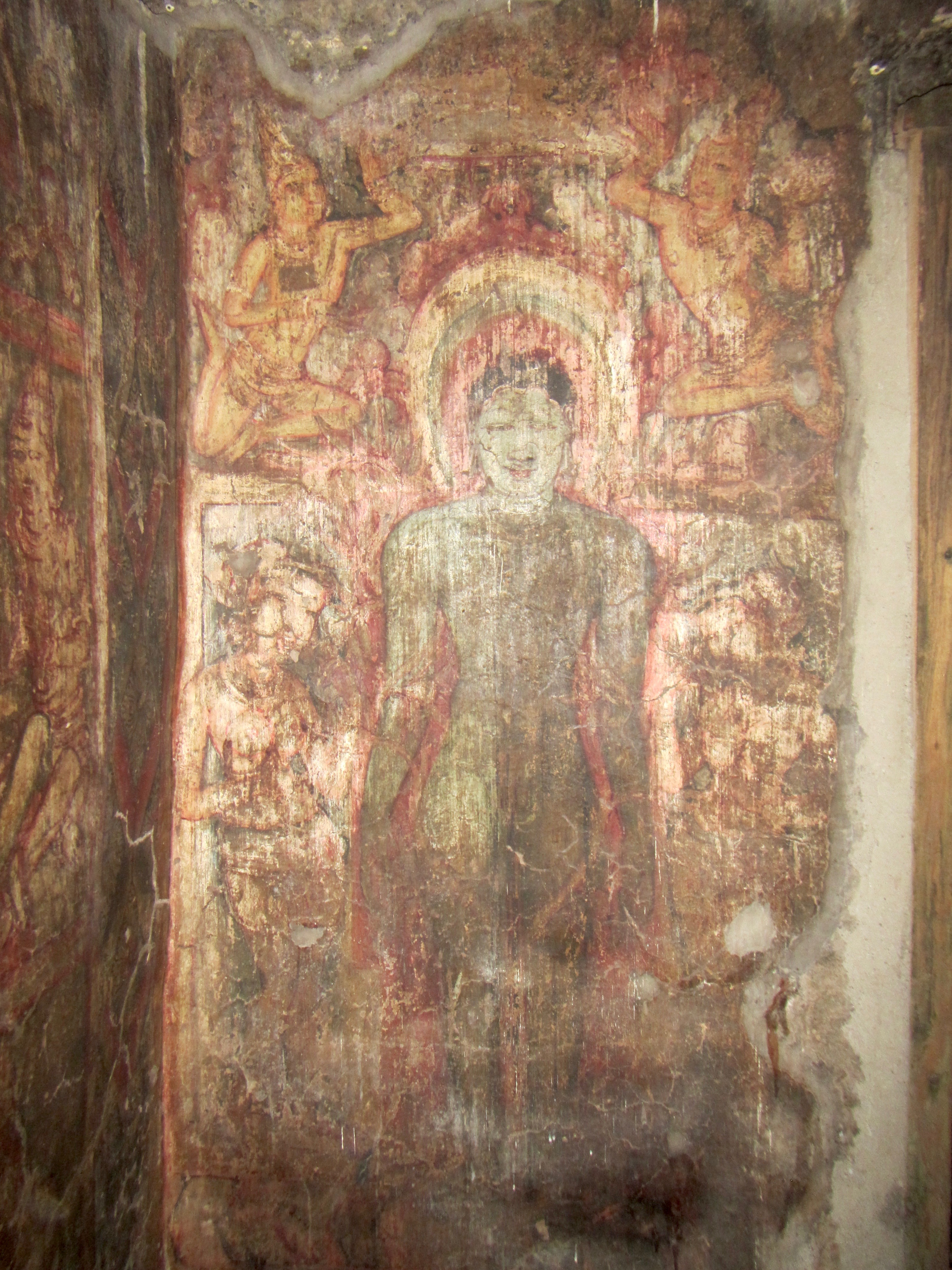
Painting Jain Ellora Caves

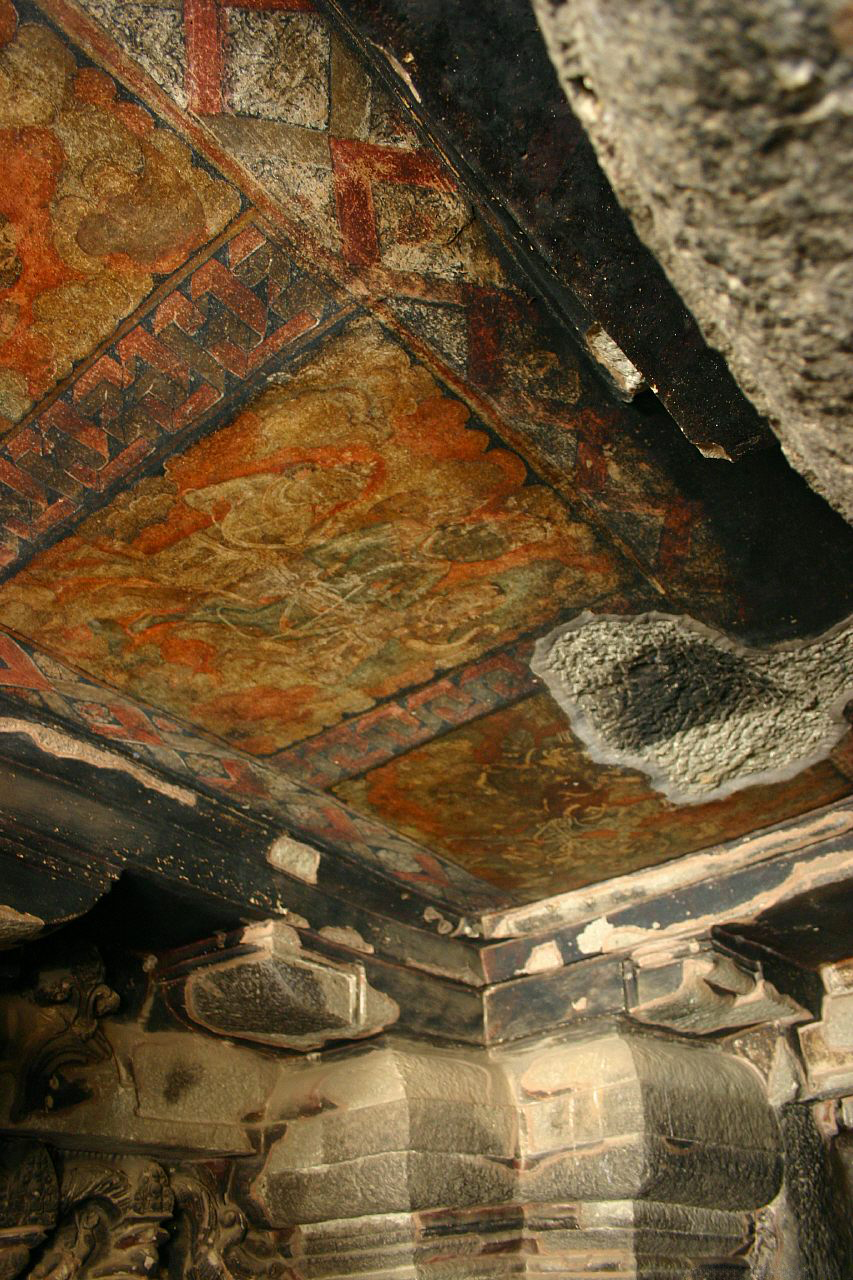
Cave 32

The carvings at Ellora were at one time profusely painted. The rock was covered with a lime plaster which was painted. The plaster and the paint has survived in places.

A digital restoration of an Ellora mural
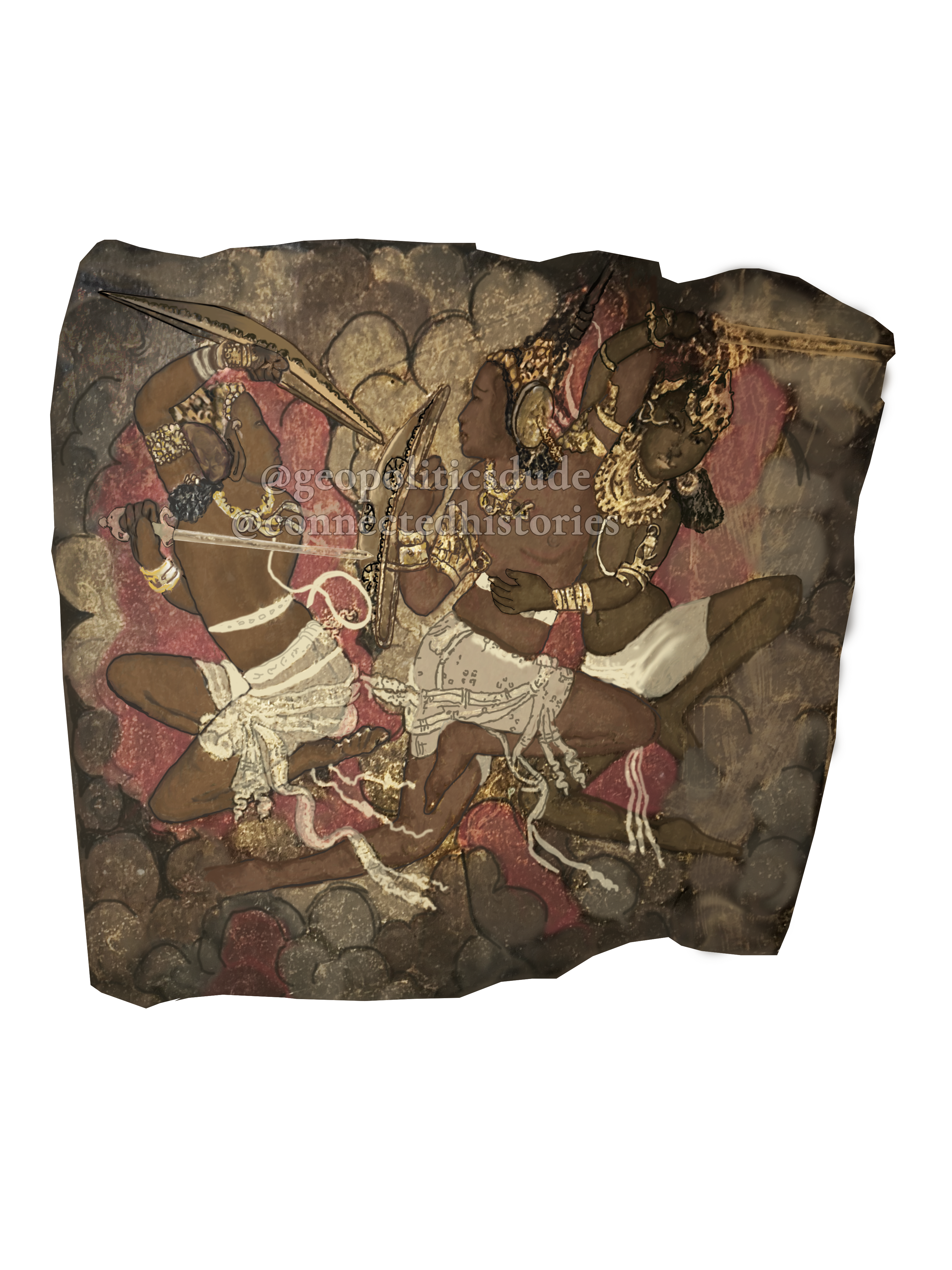
Digitally restored Ellora mural of the Rashtrakuta period

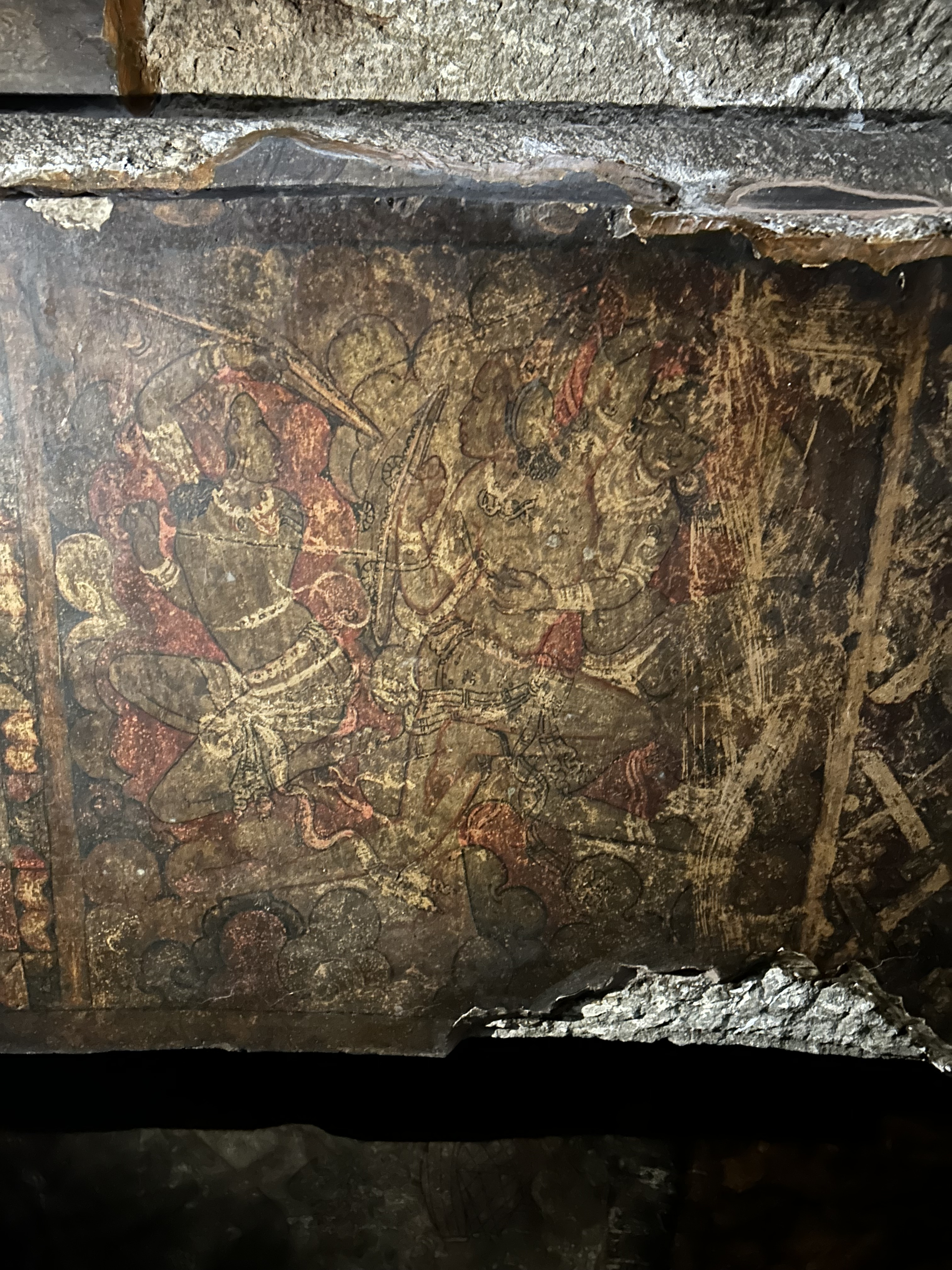
Ellora mural of the Rashtrakuta period

== In popular culture ==
The famous Bengali filmmaker (and author) Satyajit Ray wrote the crime thriller novel Kailashey Kelenkari in 1974, featuring fictional detective Feluda. In the novel, Feluda travels to the Ellora caves to uncover a smuggling racket involving illegal trade of historical artifacts from Indian temples, including the largest cave at Ellora, the Kailasa Temple. Satyajit's son Sandip Ray adapted the novel into a movie of the same name in 2007.

== In art and literature ==
Fisher's Drawing Room Scrap Book, 1832 contains a plate of 'Skeletal Group in the Ramedwur, Caves of Ellora, supposed to represent the nuptials of Siva and Parvati' by George Cattermole, engraved by W. Kelsall, accompanied by a poetical illustration by Letitia Elizabeth Landon paraphrased from a translation from the Siva-Pooraun. This is from cave 21.

== See also ==
- Ajanta Caves – Buddhist cave monuments in Maharashtra, India
- Badami cave temples – 6th-8th century Hindu and Jain cave temples in Karnataka, India
- Barabar Caves – Ancient rock-cut caves in India with Ashokan inscriptions
- Elephanta Caves – Collection of cave temples in Maharashtra, India
- Indian rock-cut architecture – Creation of structures by excavating solid rock
- List of colossal sculpture in situ – Large sculptures carved into a material that remain at location
- Pitalkhora Caves – Ancient Buddhist caves in India
- List of rock-cut temples in India
- Tourism in India
- Tourism in Marathwada
- Udayagiri Caves – Early 5th century Hindu and Jain cave temples in Madhya Pradesh
