= Ramatheertam =

Ramatheertam Ramatheertam
- historical village
- Location in Andhra Pradesh, India
- Coordinates: 14.6479°N 80.1445°E
- Country: India
- State: Andhra Pradesh
- District: Nellore District

Languages
  - Official: Telugu
- Time zone: UTC+5:30 (IST)
- Nearest city: Nellore

Ramathirtham or Ramatheertam is situated in Nellore District of Andhra Pradesh state.

== History ==
Ramathirtham is a Historical Buddhist Remnant site in Nellore District.

=== Bodipati Dibba ===
Recent Exploration at a mound towards east of the Ramalingeswara temple yielded some historical ancient remains. Black and red Polished ware, terracota and brick remnant's were recovered from the site. This site may contain Buddhist remains as found at Chejarla Temple in Guntur district. Excavations are under progress at this site.

=== Temple ===
Ramalingeswara Swamy Temple in Ramathirtham. Lord Siva and Kamakshamma are the presiding deities while Vigneswara and Subramanya Swamy are the also worshipped here. The architecture is reminiscent of the Pallava style with the temple built of bricks, a Dwaja Stambam, Kalyana Mandapam, Alankara Mandapam and Yajnasala for Nithyyagnam. The main temple is very small and covered with white granite rock. Mythologically Ramatheertam holds a lot of respect among the devotees as it was the place where, as per the scriptures, Lord Rama was stated to have stopped for a night halt during his search for Sita. At daybreak, Lord Rama carved out a Shiva Lingam from sand with his hands and offered prayers.

== Map ==
Refer wikimapia link for the above described geographies: http://wikimapia.org/#lat=14.6478641&lon=80.1444832&z=15&l=0&m=b&v=8
