= Ogive =

Roundly tapered end of a two- or three-dimensional object

A secant ogive of sharpness $E = 120/100= 1.2$

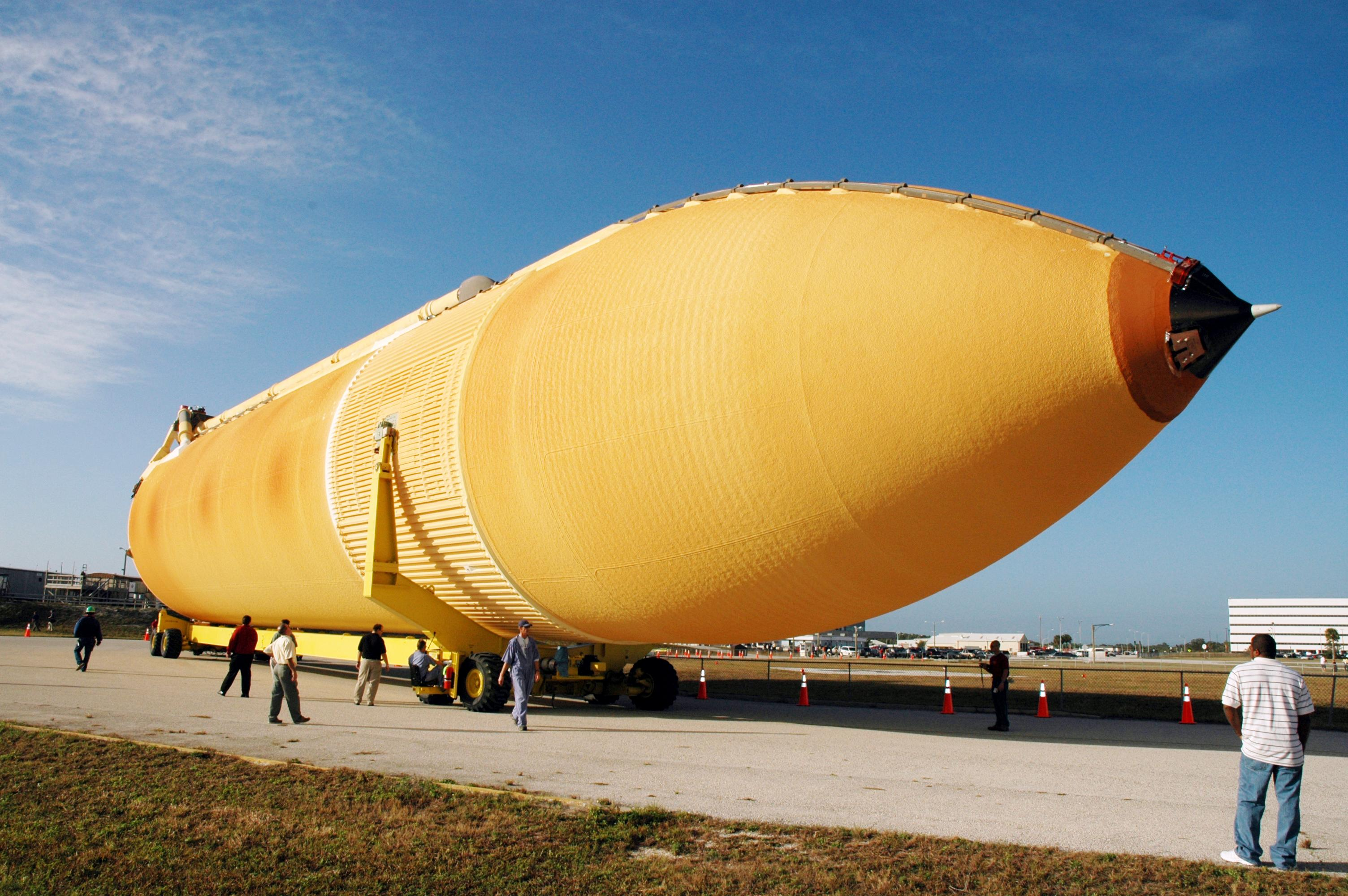
The ogive shape of the Space Shuttle external tank

Ogive on a 9×19mm Parabellum cartridge

An ogive (/ˈoʊdʒaɪv/ OH-jyve) is the roundly tapered end of a two- or three-dimensional object. Ogive curves and surfaces are used in engineering, architecture, woodworking, and ballistics.

== Etymology ==
The French Orientalist Georges Séraphin Colin gives as the term's origin the Arabic al-ġubb (الجُبّ) 'cistern', pronounced al-ġibb (الجِبّ) in vernacular Iberian Arabic, through the Spanish aljibe or archaically algibe.

The earliest use of the word ogive is found in the 13th-century sketchbook of Villard de Honnecourt, from Picardy in northern France. The Oxford English Dictionary considers the French term's origin obscure; it might come from the Late Latin obviata, the feminine perfect passive participle of obviare, meaning the one who has met or encountered the other. However, Merriam-Webster's dictionary says it is from the "Middle English oggif stone comprising an arch, from Middle French augive, ogive diagonal arch". According to Wiktionary, the French term comes "from Vulgar Latin augīvus, from Latin augēre, as the ogive goes on increasing, and the arch it forms increases the strength of the vault. In Old French we find the phrase arc ogif, itself from Latin arcus augivus. The word was also written as augive in the 17th century."

== Types and use in applied physical science and engineering ==
In ballistics or aerodynamics, an ogive is a pointed, curved surface mainly used to form the approximately streamlined nose of a bullet or other projectile, reducing air resistance or the drag of air. The French word ogive can be translated as "nose cone" or "warhead".

The traditional or secant ogive is a surface of revolution of the same curve that forms a Gothic arch; that is, a circular arc, of greater radius than the diameter of the cylindrical section ("shank"), is drawn from the edge of the shank until it intercepts the axis.

If this arc is drawn so that it meets the shank at zero angle (that is, the distance of the centre of the arc from the axis, plus the radius of the shank, equals the radius of the arc), then it is called a tangent or spitzer ogive. This is a very common ogive for high velocity (supersonic) rifle bullets.

The sharpness of this ogive is expressed by the ratio of its radius to the diameter of the cylinder; a value of one half being a hemispherical dome, and larger values being progressively more pointed. Values of 4 to 10 are commonly used in rifle bullets, with 6 being the most common.

Another common ogive for bullets is the elliptical ogive. This is a curve very similar to the spitzer ogive, except that the circular arc is replaced by an ellipse defined in such a way that it meets the axis at exactly 90°. This gives a somewhat rounded nose regardless of the sharpness ratio. An elliptical ogive is normally described in terms of the ratio of the length of the ogive to the diameter of the shank. A ratio of one half would be, once again, a hemisphere. Values close to 1 are common in practice. Elliptical ogives are mainly used in pistol bullets.

More complex ogives can be derived from minimum turbulence calculations rather than geometric forms, such as the von Kármán ogive used for supersonic missiles, aircraft and ordnance.

== Architecture ==
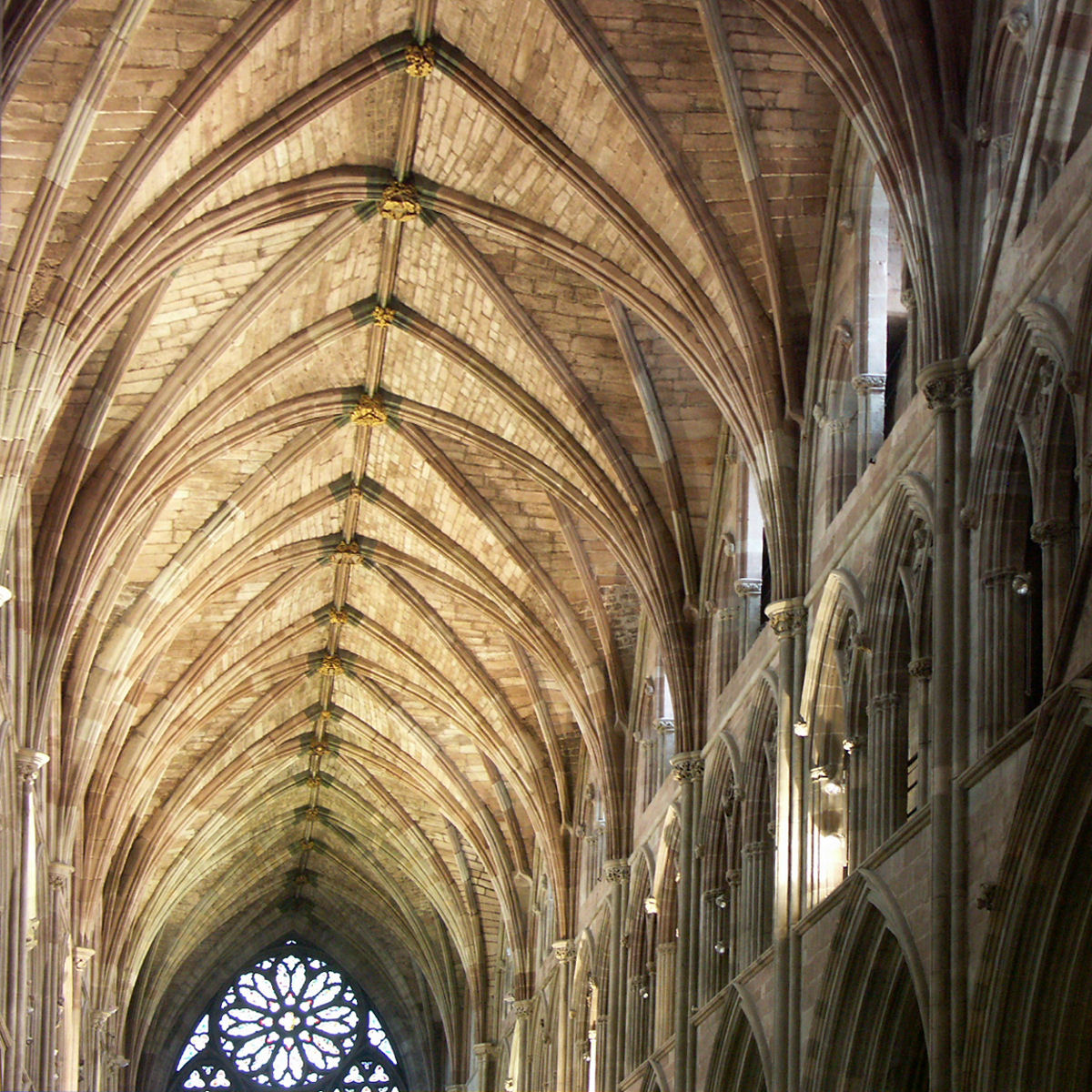
Ogival curves in the ribs of Gothic vaulting at Worcester Cathedral UK

One of the defining characteristics of Gothic architecture is the pointed arch.

=== History ===
Pointed arches may have originated as in the Sitamarhi caves in the 3rd century BCE. The free-standing temple of Trivikrama at Ter in Maharashtra (India) (dated to the Satavahana period of the 2nd century BCE to the 3rd century CE) also contains an ogive arch but it is constructed using corbel principles.

Excavations conducted by Archaeological Survey of India (ASI) at Kausambi revealed a palace with foundations from the 8th century BCE until the 2nd century CE, built in six phases. The last phase, dated to 1st–2nd century CE, includes an extensive structure which features four centered pointed arches which were used to span narrow passageways and segmental arches for wider areas. Pointed arches with load-bearing functions were also employed in Gandhara. A two pointed-arch vault-system was built inside the Bhitargaon temple (as noted by Alexander Cunningham) which is dated to the early Gupta period of the 4th–5th centuries CE. Pointed arches also appeared in Mahabodhi temple with relieving arches and vaults between the 6th and 7th centuries CE.

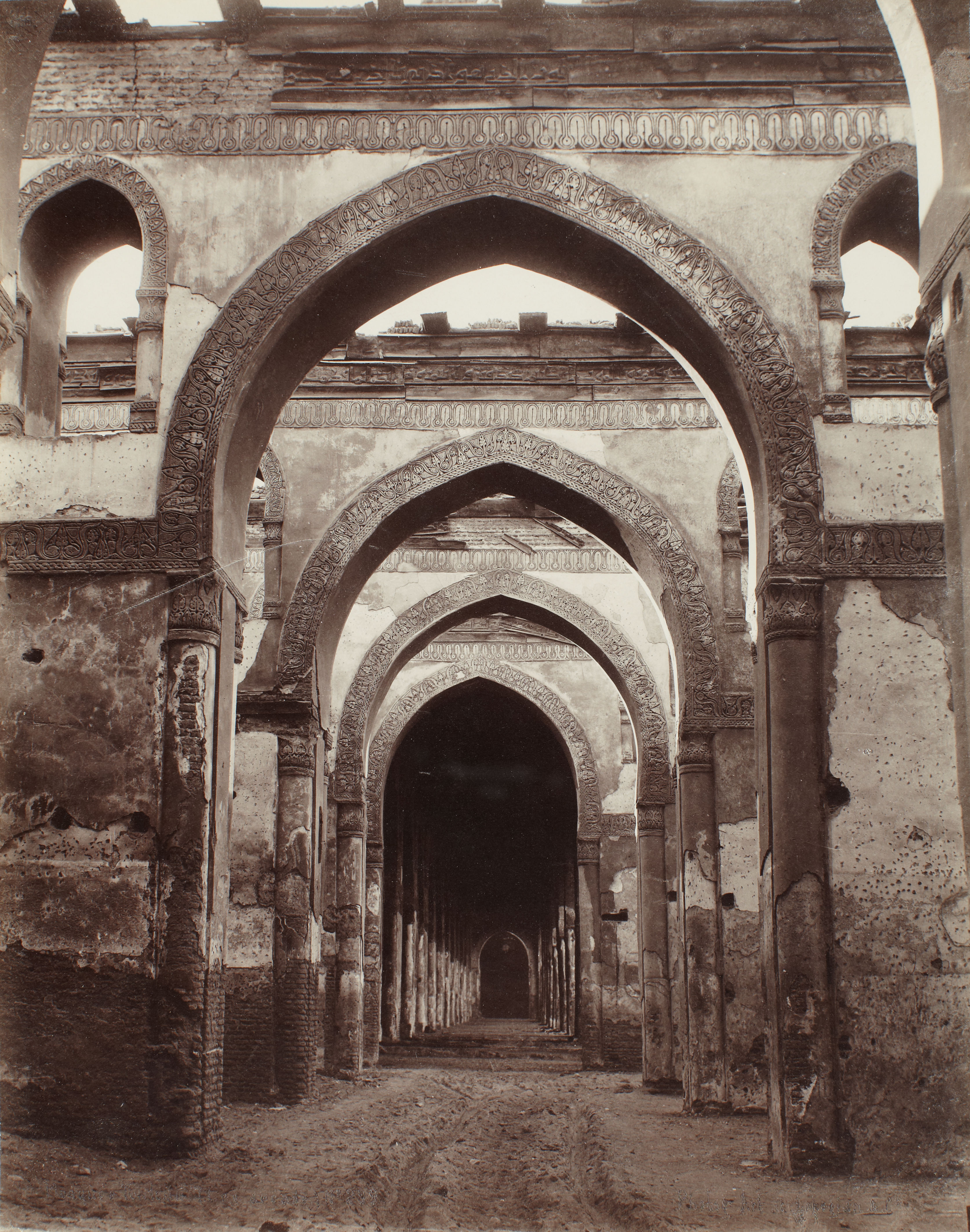
Pointed arches of Ibn Tulun Mosque in Cairo (9th century) prior to its restoration

The 5th- or 6th-century CE Romano-Byzantine Karamagara Bridge in Cappadocia (in present-day Turkish Central Anatolia) features an early pointed arch as part of an apparent Romano-Greco-Syrian architectural tradition.

Several scholars see the pointed arch as first established as an architectonic principle in the Middle East in Islamic architecture during the Abbasid Caliphate in the middle of the 8th century CE. Pointed arches appeared in Christian Europe by the 11th century CE.

=== Debate ===
Some scholars have refused to accept an Indian origin of the pointed arch, including Hill (1993); some scholars have argued that pointed arches were used in the Near East in pre-Islamic architecture, but others have stated that these arches were, in fact, parabolic and not pointed arches.

=== Usage ===
Gothic architecture features ogives as the intersecting transverse ribs of arches which establish the surface of a Gothic vault. An ogive or ogival arch is a pointed, "Gothic" arch, drawn with compasses as outlined above, or with arcs of an ellipse as described. A very narrow, steeply pointed ogive arch is sometimes called a "lancet arch". The most common form is an equilateral arch, where the radius is the same as the width. In the later Flamboyant Gothic style, an "ogee arch", an arch with a pointed head, like S-shaped curves, became prevalent.

== Glaciology ==
In glaciology, the term ogives refers to alternating bands of light and dark coloured ice that occur as a result of glaciers moving through an icefall.

== See also ==
- Catenary arch
- Lancet window
- Nose cone design
- Ogee
