= Trivikrama Temple =

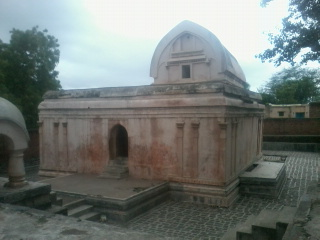
- Trivikrama Temple (front)

- Location within Maharashtra Trivikrama Temple (Maharashtra)

Religion
- Affiliation: Hinduism
- District: Osmanabad

Location
- Location: Ter, Maharashtra
- State: Maharashtra
- Country: India
- Coordinates: 18°19′10″N 76°8′30″E

The Trivikrama Temple, also named Ter Temple, is a temple of Vamana (an incarnation of Vishnu) in Ter, Maharashtra. Henry Cousens, followed by most later writers, believed that it was originally a Buddhist temple, however in 1957 M. S. Mate disputed this view. He explained that the apsidal plan was used for Hindu temples for nearly six centuries. The earliest is the Durga temple at Aihole in Bijapur district. The wagon-vaulted ridge roof of trivikrama temple is similar to the roof used for the Sahadeva Ratha at Mahabalipuram.

The temple is original in that it was initially based on a free-standing apsidal structure, now located at the back of the building, which is characteristic of early Buddhist apsidal caityagriha designs. The apsidal structure seems to be contemporary to the great apsidal temple found in Sirkap, Taxila, which is dated to 30 BCE-50 CE. It would have been built under the Satavahanas, in the 2nd or 3rd century CE.

The external flat-roofed mandapa structure is probably only an addition from the 6th century CE, when the temple was converted into a Hindu temple. A stone image of Trivikrama probably dates to the early Chalukyas.

The front of the apsidal temple is decorated with a chaitya-arch, similar to those found in Buddhist rock-cut architecture.

Another known Hindu temple constructed in a Chaitya-style, is the Pallava period Kapoteswara temple at Chezarla in Guntur district. The legend behind the deity Kapoteswara is the story of Sibi in Mahabharata which also occurs in Sibi Jataka

The Trivikrama Temple is considered as the oldest standing structure in Maharashtra.

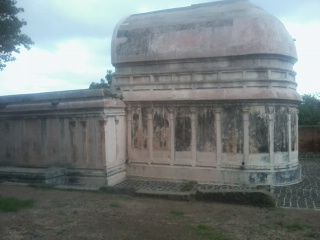
Side view

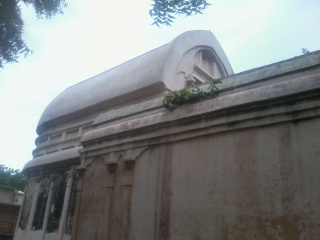
View of the upper part of the temple

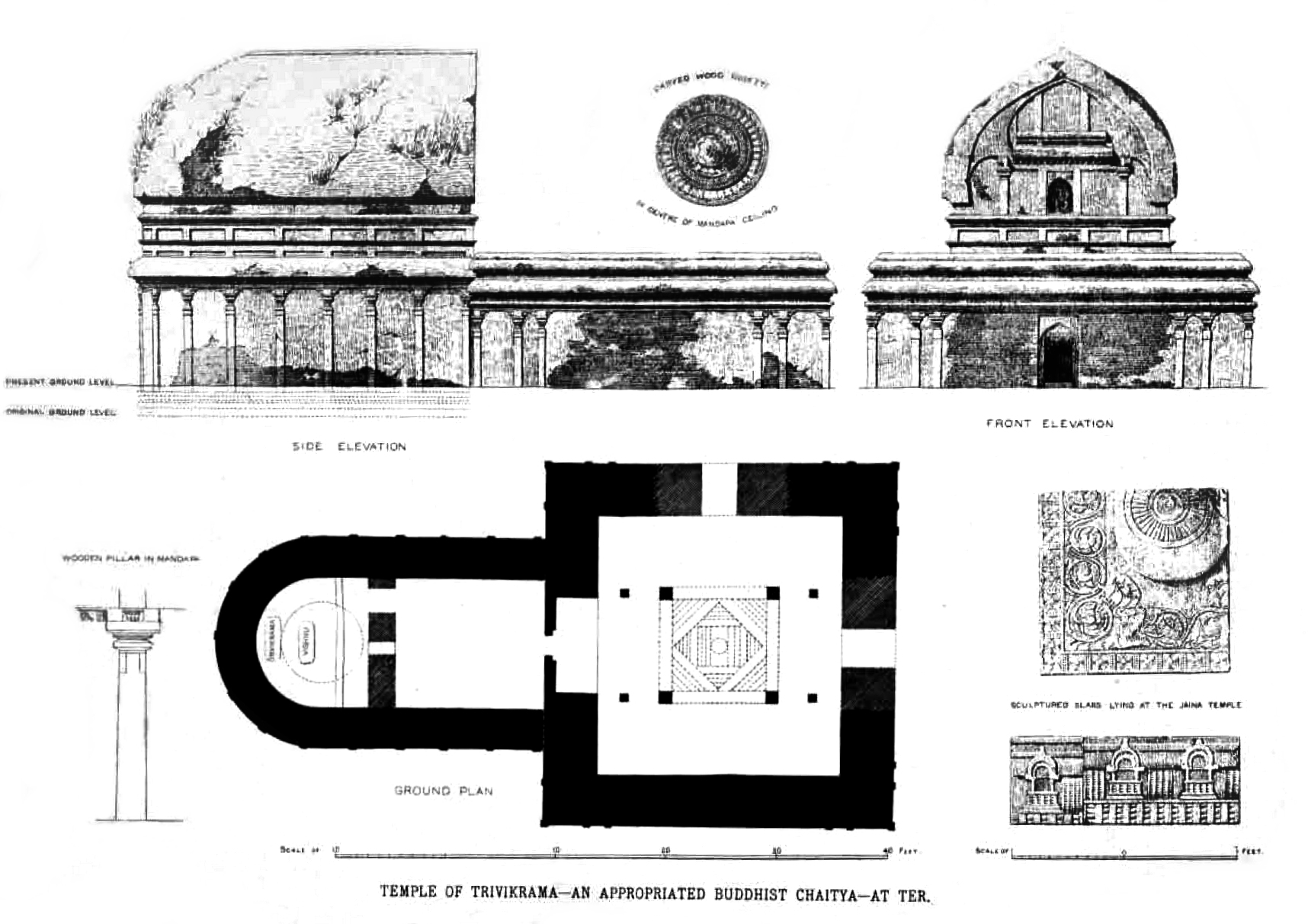
Plan and elevation of the Trivikrama Temple.

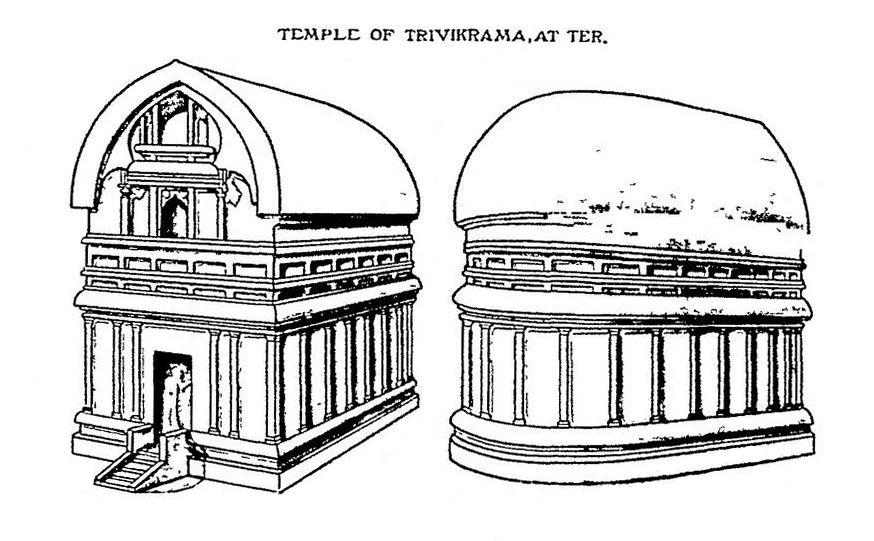
Reconstitution of the original Buddhist apsidal temple.

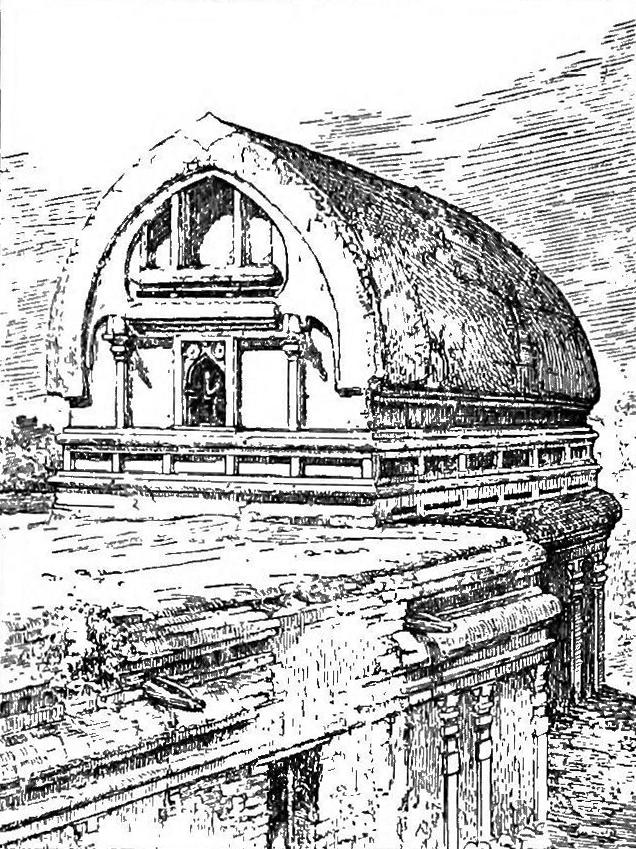
The ancient Buddhist chaitya house at Ter.

== See also ==
- Architecture of India
