= Chejerla, Palnadu district =

Chejerla
- Village
- Interactive map of Chejerla
- Location in Andhra Pradesh, India
- Coordinates: 16°18′59″N 79°50′58″E
- Country: India
- State: Andhra Pradesh
- District: Palnadu
- Mandal: Nekarikallu

Government
  - Type: Panchayati raj
  - Body: Chejarla Grama panchayat

Area
  - Total: 1,656 ha (4,090 acres)

Population (2011)
  - Total: 4,094
  - Density: 247.2/km^{2} (640.3/sq mi)

Languages
  - Official: Telugu
- Time zone: UTC+5:30 (IST)
- PIN: 522xxx
- Area code: +91–
- Vehicle registration: AP

Chejarla is a village in Palnadu district of the Indian state of Andhra Pradesh. It is located in Nekarikallu mandal of Narasaraopet revenue division.

== History ==
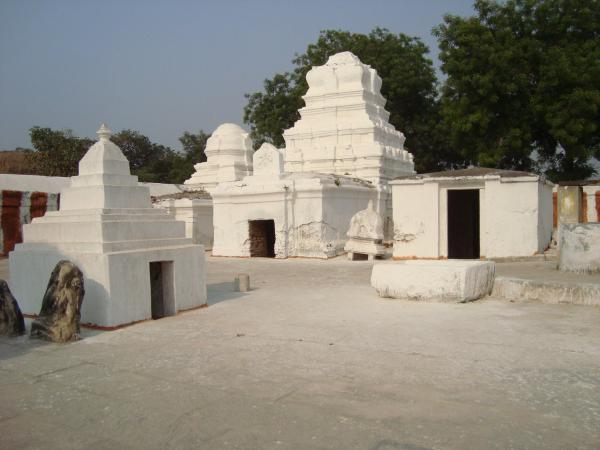
Amvar chejarla temple Palnadu district

The village of Chejerla stands in the plains, surrounded by rocky hills, and covered by scrub jungle. The temple here is dedicated to Lord Siva, known as Kapotheswara, and dates back to the 4th or 5th century AD. The legend behind the deity reflects a powerful story of charity and sacrifice. King Sibhi Chakravarthi, renowned for his charity (dāna), planned to perform a Siva Homam at this site. To test his resolve, the Trimurti—Lord Brahma, Lord Vishnu, and Lord Shiva—appeared in different forms: Brahma as a willow, Vishnu as a dove (kapotham), and Shiva as a hunter (boya). The dove, seeking refuge from the hunter, pleaded for protection from King Sibhi. The hunter demanded the king give exactly the dove's weight in flesh from his own body in exchange for sparing its life. True to his promise, Sibhi began offering his flesh, and just as he was about to cut the final piece, the Trimurti revealed themselves in their divine forms, deeply impressed by Sibhi's compassion and charity. Chejerla’s Kapotheswara Swamy Temple is considered unique, possibly the only temple in India dedicated to Lord Siva in this form. The deity here is a rare representation of Siva as Kapotheswara, Lord Sibhi, embodying self-sacrifice. The temple is significant not only for its religious importance but also for its unique architectural style.

Moved by his selflessness, they offered Sibhi a boon. The king requested that they stay at this place in the form of a Linga. Thus, the Linga at the Kapotheswara Temple is said to represent Sibhi’s headless body, with wounds on the Linga symbolizing the places from which he cut off his own flesh. It is said that if the Linga is not cleaned regularly with water, it emits the smell of flesh (referred to as "neesu smell"), a phenomenon believed by devotees to be proof that Kapotheswara Swamy’s body remains alive in the form of the Linga. Beyond this, Chejerla hosts several other notable shrines, including the Kshetra Palaka Hanuman Temple and a temple dedicated to Kumaraswamy. Visitors interested in historical and powerful temples are encouraged to visit, though the temple is currently in need of more recognition and support for its upkeep. This story is significant not only in Hindu mythology but also in the Buddhist Jataka tales, which recount the previous lives of Siddhartha, the Buddha. The story of Sibi Chakravarti, known as the Sibi Jataka, is revered in both traditions as a symbol of supreme 'Raja Dharma'—the duty of a king to protect a refugee at any cost. Historical evidence suggests that the site once hosted a Buddhist monastery, later converted into a Hindu shrine.

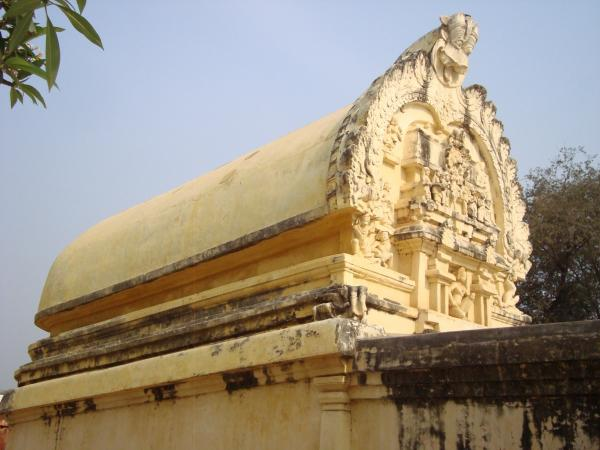
Amvar Chejerla Kapoteswara temple in guntur district

The Kapotheswara Temple is built in an unusual apsidal (Hasti prasta) style, an architectural form originally associated with Buddhist chaityas. The apsidal end of the temple houses a white marble Linga in its center. Historical evidence indicates that the temple was constructed during a period of religious harmony between Hinduism and Buddhism, with influences from both traditions reflected in its architecture. Another example of this apsidal style is the Trivikrama Temple at Ter, Maharashtra.

== Governance ==
Chejerla gram panchayat is the local self-government of the village. It is divided into wards and each ward is represented by a ward member.

== Education ==
As per the school information report for the academic year 2018–19, the village has a total of 3 Zilla Parishad/MPP schools.
