= Ter, Maharashtra =

Village in Maharashtra

Ter
- village
- Location in Maharashtra, India Ter (Maharashtra)
- Coordinates: 18.3212985°N 76.1329707°E
- Country: India
- State: Maharashtra
- District: Osmanabad
- Division: Aurangabad
- Elevation: 679 m (2,228 ft)

Population (2011)
  - Total: 12,479
- Sex ratio 6,481/5,998 ♂/♀

Language
  - Official: Marathi
- Time zone: UTC+5:30 (IST)
- PIN: 413509
- Telephone code: 02472
- ISO 3166 code: IN-MH
- Website: maharashtra.gov.in

Ter is a village in Osmanabad district of Maharashtra state, India. It is 17 kilometres (11 mi) from the district headquarters, Osmanabad, 50 kilometres (31 mi) from Latur.

== History ==
The Periplus of the Erythraean Sea mentions a trading centre called Tagara, which has been identified with modern Ter.

There is an ancient miraculous idol of the 24th tirthankara of the Jains, Lord Mahavira, more than 800 years old. The temple has unearthed inscriptions which say that the samavshara of lord Mahavir came to this place.

Ter, settled along both banks of the Terna River, is a historically important village in Osmanabad district some 32.19 km (20 miles) from the tehsils headquarters. Its antiquity traces as far back as the Puranas, wherein it is referred to as Satyapuri and in the ancient period of our history as Tagarnagar. It was mentioned in the Periplus of the Erythraean Sea as one of the two pre-eminent centres, along with Pratisthana, in modern Paithan in Aurangabad district. The Periplus says that all kinds of mercantile goods from throughout the Deccan Plateau were brought to Tagara and from there conveyed in carts to Bharuch. It traded with the outside world, especially Greece and Rome; Roman coins recently discovered here lend weight to this fact.

It reached the height of its commercial prosperity during the Satavahana period. Ter was the capital of one of the branches of the Silaharas, many of whose seals and coins depicting an elephant giving a bath to Mahalaksmi, the family deity of the silaharas, have been unearthed here. In the same way objects like potsherds, beads, garlands, combs, dolls, conch shells, old bricks and many ivory objects uncovered in the excavations undertaken at Ter and its environs throw valuable light not only on the history of the village but also on the cultural, architectural and various other aspects and accomplishments of the people who inhabited the region in ancient times. Deeper excavations are being carried in the hills around Ter, which are yielding valuable material. The remains discovered so far, point to a rich cultural heritage. Dr. Hiralal Jain in his Karandakacaritra, a Jain book, refers to caves near Osmanabad as Ter caves, as they are nearer to this village. In the mediaeval period, the village shot into prominence as a centre of religious propagation. The well-known saint of Maharastra, Gora Kumbhar, a contemporary of Saint Jnyanesvar, was a resident of this village and in his days it was frequently the scene of gatherings of saintly personages. Scholars of saint literature are of the opinion that Ter had a hand in the propagation of Bhagvat dharma.

== Demographics ==
In 2011, the village had a population of 12,479 of whom 6,481 were male and 5,998 female, according to the 2011 Census of India.

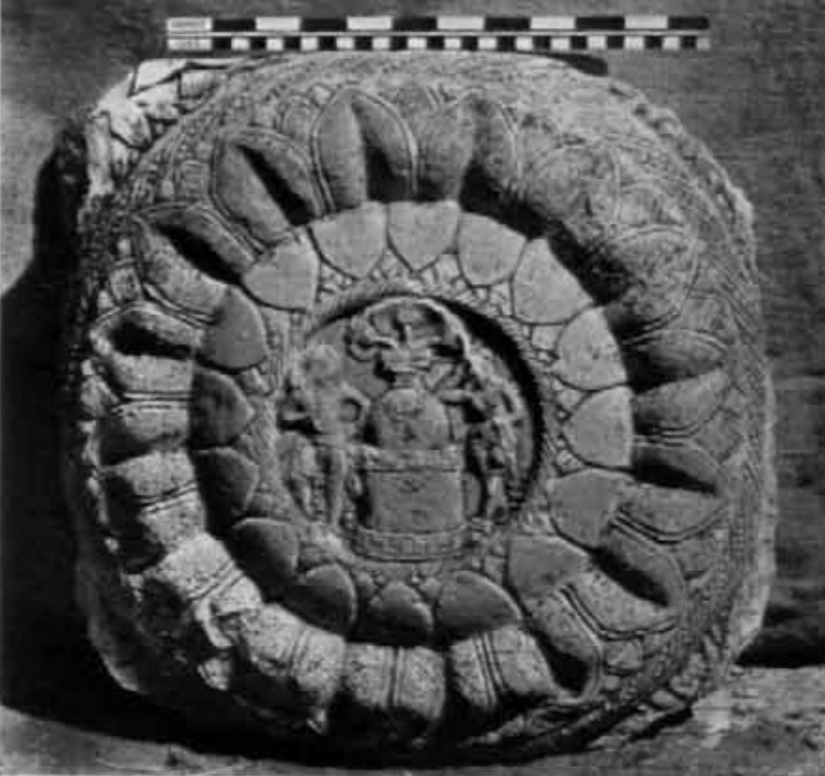
Ter, limestone medallion

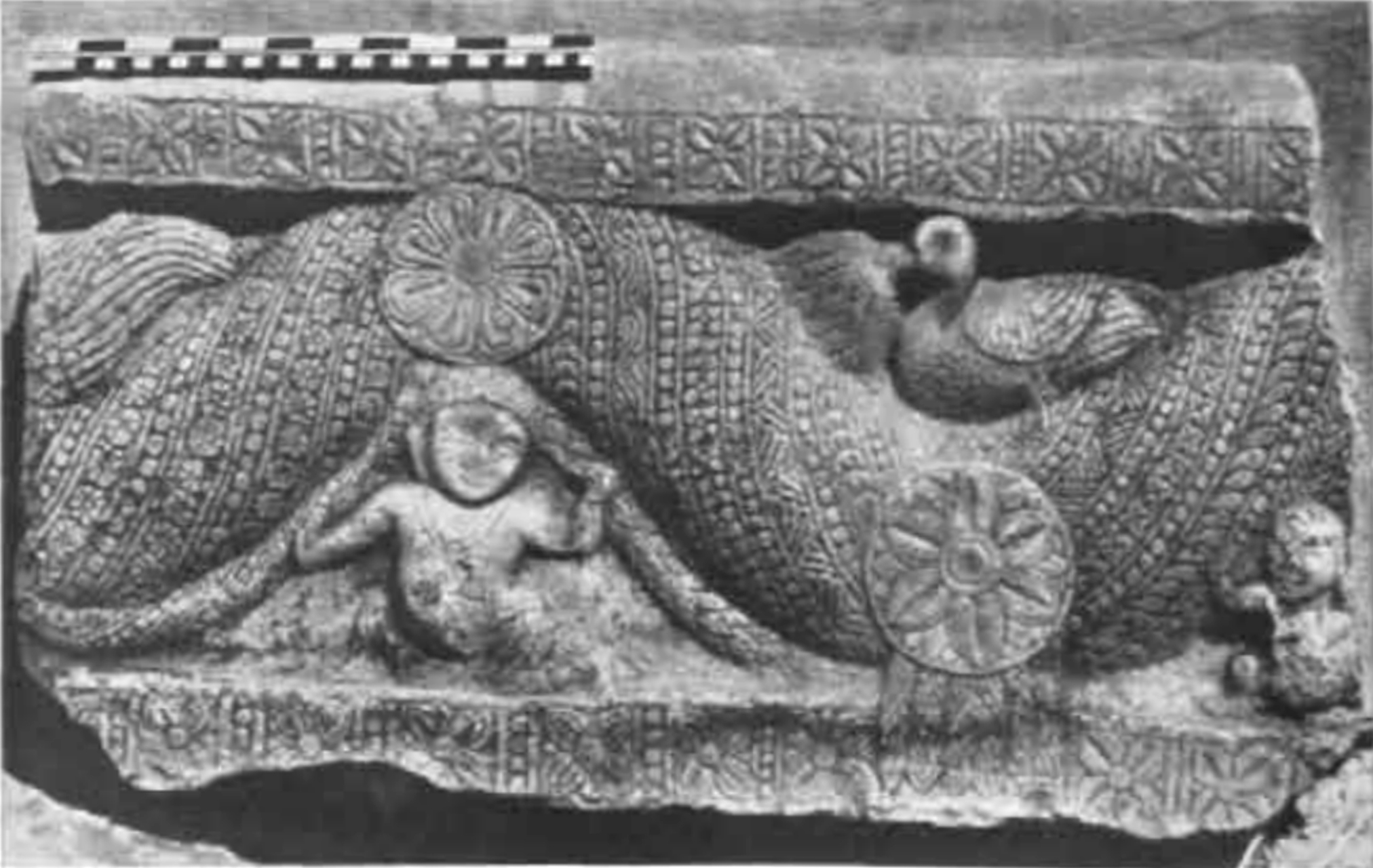
Ter, limestone coping fragment with Garland bearers.
