= Satavahana dynasty =

Indian dynasty (2nd century BCE – 3rd century CE)

- c. late 2nd cent. BCE–c. 224 CE
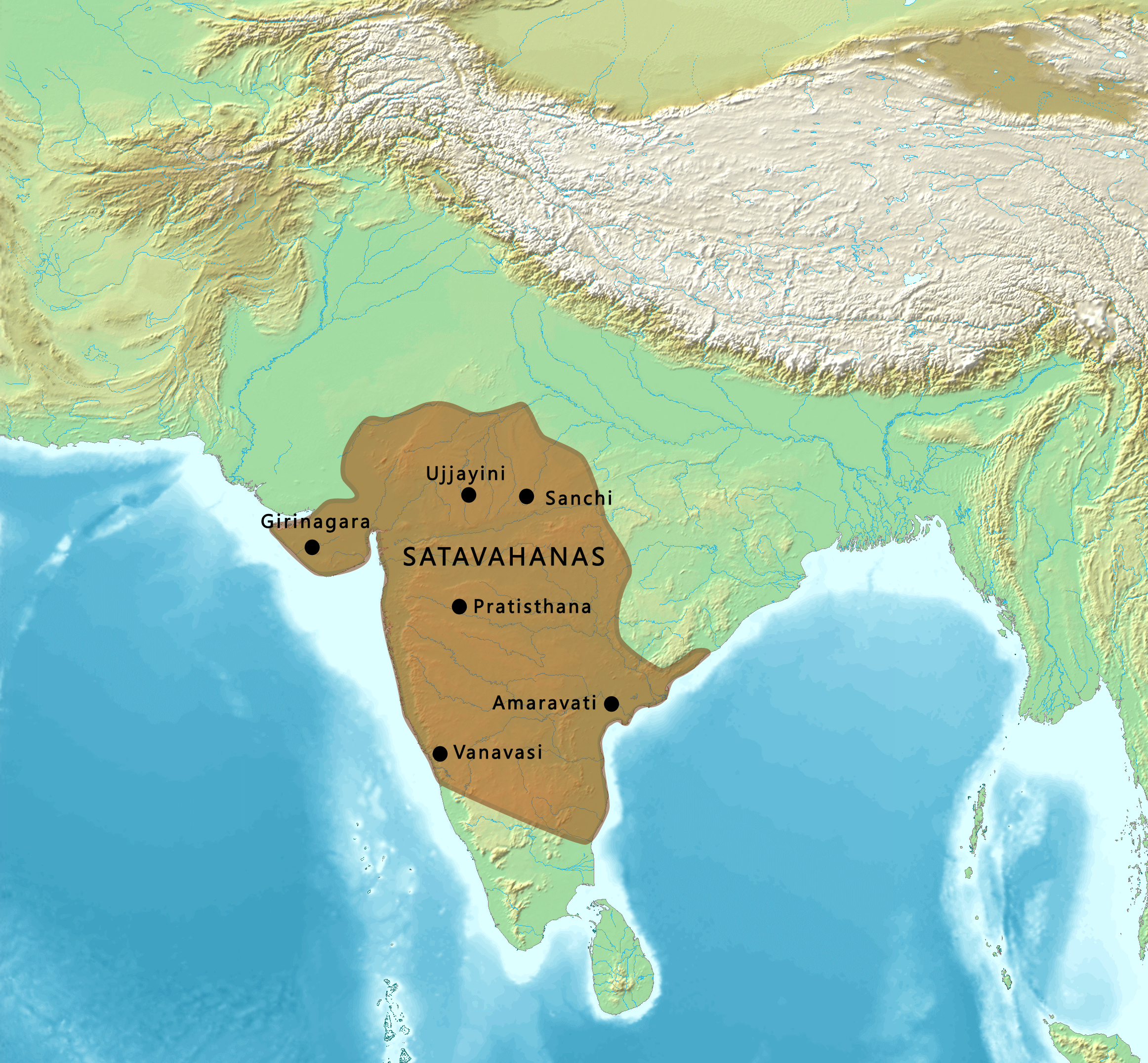
- Approximate extent of the Satavahana Empire, in the early 1st century CE.
- Capital: Pratishthana; Amaravati; Pauni; Junnar
- Official languages: Prakrit(official, court, literature, inscriptions)
- Common languages: Maharashtri Prakrit (literature); Sanskrit (literature)
- Religion: Vaishnavism; Shaivism; Mahayana Buddhism; Jainism; Brahmanism
- Government: Monarchy
- Raja
  - c. 2nd/1st cent. BCE: Simuka (first)
  - 217–224 CE: Pulumavi IV (last)
- Historical era: Classical India
  - Established: c. late 2nd cent. BCE
  - Disestablished: c. 224 CE
Preceded by
Maurya Empire
Kanva dynasty
Succeeded by
Western Kshatrapas
Andhra Ikshvaku
Chutu dynasty
Vakataka dynasty
Pallava dynasty
Abhira dynasty
- Today part of: India

The Satavahanas (/ˌsɑːtəˈvɑːhənə/; Sādavāhana or Sātavāhana, IAST: Sātavāhana), also referred to as the Andhras (also Andhra-bhṛtyas or Andhra-jatiyas) in the Puranas, were an ancient Indian dynasty. Most modern scholars believe that the Satavahana rule began in the late 2nd century BCE and lasted until the early 3rd century CE, although some assign the beginning of their rule to as early as the 3rd century BCE based on the Puranas, but uncorroborated by archaeological evidence. The Satavahana kingdom mainly comprised the present-day Andhra Pradesh, Telangana, and Maharashtra. At different times, their rule extended to parts of modern Gujarat, Madhya Pradesh, and Karnataka. The dynasty had different capital cities at different times, including Pratishthana (Paithan) and Amaravati (Dharanikota).

The origin of the dynasty is uncertain, but according to the Puranas, their first king overthrew the Kanva dynasty. In the post-Maurya era, the Satavahanas established peace in the Deccan region and resisted the onslaught of foreign invaders. In particular their struggles with the Saka (Western Satraps) went on for a long time. The dynasty reached its zenith under the rule of Gautamiputra Satakarni and his successor Vasisthiputra Pulamavi. The kingdom had fragmented into smaller states by the early 3rd century CE.

The Satavahanas were early issuers of Indian state coinage struck with images of their rulers. They formed a cultural bridge and played a vital role in trade and the transfer of ideas and culture to and from the Indo-Gangetic Plain to the southern tip of India.

== Origins ==
The date and place of origin of the Satavahanas, as well as the meaning of the dynasty's name, are a matter of debate among historians. Some of these debates have happened in the context of regionalism, with the present-day Andhra Pradesh, Telangana and Maharashtra, being variously claimed as the original homeland of the Satavahanas.

=== Etymology ===
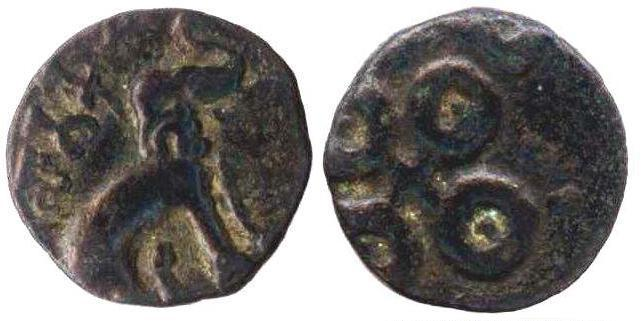
Early coin of Satakarni I (70-60 BCE). Obverse legend: (𑀲𑀺𑀭𑀺) 𑀲𑀸 𑀡𑀺(𑀲), (Siri) Sātakaṇi(sa).

Śātavāhana, Śālivāhana, Śātakarṇi seem to be Sanskritised versions of the indigenous name Sātakaṇi, which appear as Sālavāhaṇa in Prakrit vernacular.

According to one theory, the word "Satavahana" (Brahmi script: 𑀲𑀸𑀤𑀯𑀸𑀳𑀦 Sādavāhana or 𑀲𑀸𑀢𑀯𑀸𑀳𑀦 Sātavāhana, IAST: Sātavāhana) is a Prakrit form of the Sanskrit Sapta-Vahana ("driven by seven"; in Hindu mythology, the chariot of the sun god is drawn by seven horses). This would indicate that the Satavahanas originally claimed association with the legendary solar dynasty, as was common in ancient India. According to Inguva Kartikeya Sarma, the dynasty's name is derived from the words sata ("sharpened", "nimble" or "swift") and vahana ("vehicle"); the expression thus means "one who rides a nimble horse".

Another theory connects their name to the earlier Satiyaputa dynasty. Yet another theory derives their name from the Munda words Sadam ("horse") and Harpan ("son"), implying "son of the performer of a horse sacrifice". Several rulers of the dynasty bear the name or title "Satakarni". Satavahana, Satakarni, Satakani and Shalivahana appear to be variations of the same word. Damodar Dharmanand Kosambi theorised that the word "Satakarni" is derived from the Munda words sada ("horse") and kon ("son").

The Puranas use the name "Andhra" for the Satavahanas. The term "Andhra" may refer to the ethnicity or territory of the dynasty (see Original homeland below). It does not appear in the dynasty's own records.

The Tamil epic Cilappatikaram mentions a "Nurruvar Kannar", who helped Chera king Senguttuvan during his Himalayan campaign. The direct translation of the term Nurruvar Kannar is "the hundred Karnas" or "Satakarni"; Nurruvar Kannar has therefore been identified with the Satavahana dynasty.

The Kathasaritsagara ascribes a mythical etymology in which a widowed, childless king named Deepakarni was prophesied to find a lion-riding child as his heir. During a jungle hunt, he found such a child riding a yaksha-turned-lion named Sāta. After adoption, the child became the king eventually and came to be known as Sātavāhana or Sāta-supported.

=== Original homeland ===
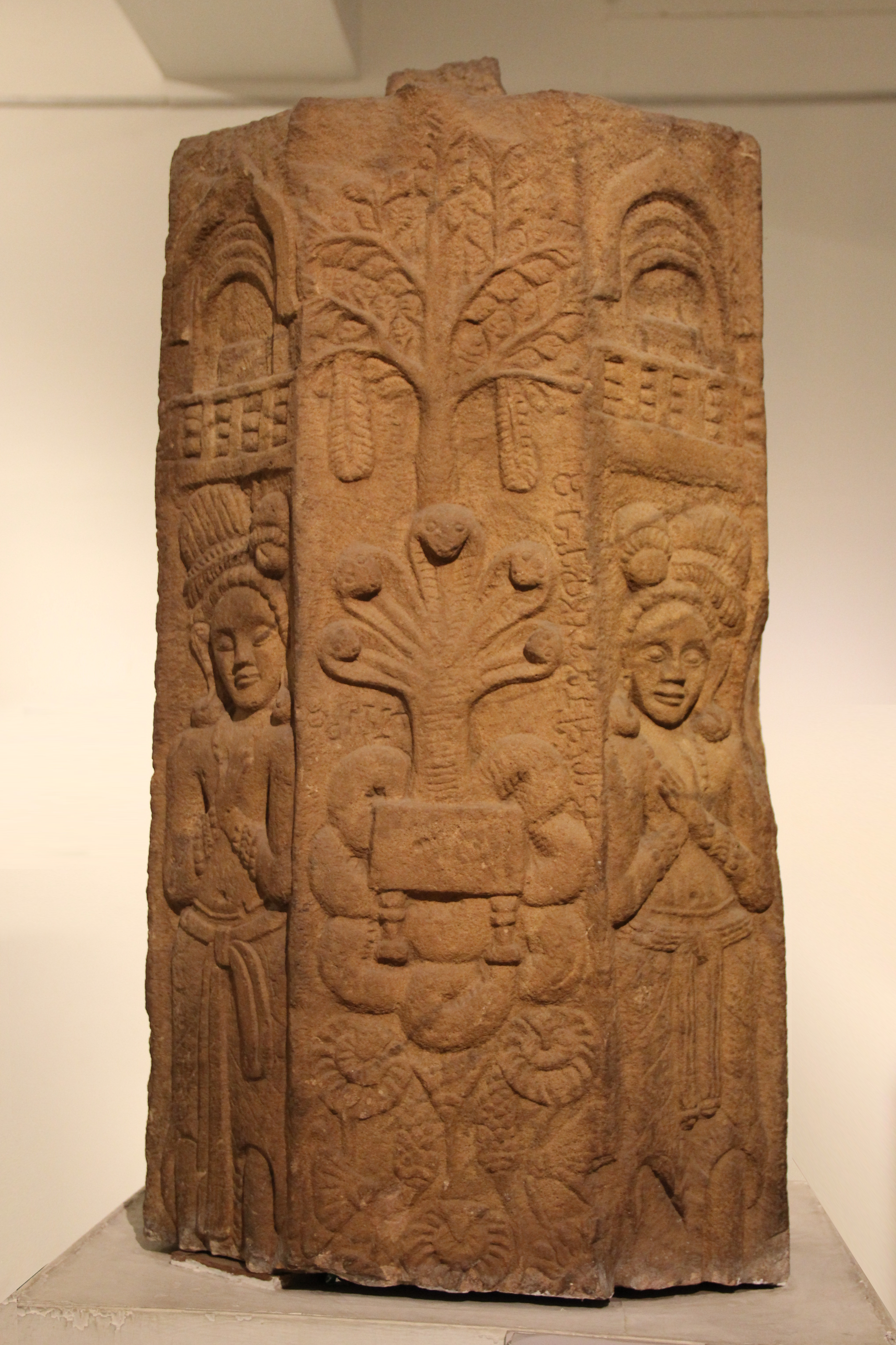
Early sculpture from Pauni, ancient Vidarbha, where coins of Satakarni were also found. Pillar with Naga Mucalinda protecting the throne of the Buddha at Pauni (Bhandara District). 2nd-1st century BCE. National Museum of India.

The use of the names "Andhra" and "Andhra-Jatiya" in the Puranas has led some scholars, such as E. J. Rapson and R.G Bhandarkar, to believe that the dynasty originated in the eastern Deccan region (the historic Andhra region, present-day Andhra Pradesh and Telangana). At Kotilingala in Telangana, coins bearing the legend "Rano Siri Chimuka Satavahanasa" were found. Epigraphist and numismatist P. V. P. Sastry initially identified Chimuka with the dynasty's founder Simuka, Coins attributed to Simuka's successors Kanha and Satakarni I were also discovered at Kotilingala. Based on these discoveries, historians such as Ajay Mitra Shastri, D. R. Reddy, S. Reddy, and Shankar R. Goyal theorised that Kotlingala was the original home of the Satavahanas. Ajay Mitra Shastri stated that the finding of the coins at Kotilingala give "a clear pointer to the region where we have to locate the original center of the Satavahana political authority." However, the coin samples from Kotlingala are small, and it is not certain if these coins were minted there or reached there from somewhere else. Moreover, the identification of Chimuka of Kotilingala with the dynasty's founder Simuka has been contested by several scholars including P. L. Gupta and I. K. Sarma, who identified Chimuka as a later ruler. P. V. P. Sastry also later changed his view and stated that the two kings were different. In addition to the Kotilinga find, a coin of the Satavahana prince Saktikumara, who was in the fourth generation of the founder, has been reported as a stratified find from the Kurnool district of Andhra Pradesh. As for the Puranas, these texts could have been compiled at a later date and it is not certain if the Satavahanas were referred to as Andhras during their time.

Another section of scholars believe that the Satavahanas originated in western Deccan (present-day Maharashtra). All four extant inscriptions from the early Satavahana period (c. 1st century BCE) have been found in and around this region. One of the earliest known Satavahana inscriptions was that found at Cave No.19 of the Pandavleni Caves in Nashik district, which was issued during the reign of Kanha (100–70 BCE). An inscription found at Naneghat was issued by Nayanika (or Naganika), the widow of Satakarni I; another inscription found at Naneghat has been dated to the same period on a paleographic basis. A slightly later inscription dated to the reign of Satakarni II has been found at Sanchi in Madhya Pradesh, located to the north of Maharashtra. The majority of the other Satavahana inscriptions have also been found in western Deccan. On the other hand, the epigraphic evidence from eastern Deccan does not mention the Satavahanas before the 4th century CE. At Nevasa, a seal and coins attributed to Kanha have been discovered. Coins attributed to Satakarni I have also been discovered at Nashik, Nevasa, and Pauni in Maharashtra (besides places in eastern Deccan and present-day Madhya Pradesh). Based on this evidence, some historians argue that the Satavahanas initially came to power in the area around their capital Pratishthana (modern Paithan, Maharashtra) and then expanded their territory to eastern Deccan. Carla Sinopoli cautions that the inference about the western Deccan origin of the Satavahanas is "tentative at best" given the small sample of early inscriptions.

Inscription of king Kanha (100–70 BCE)

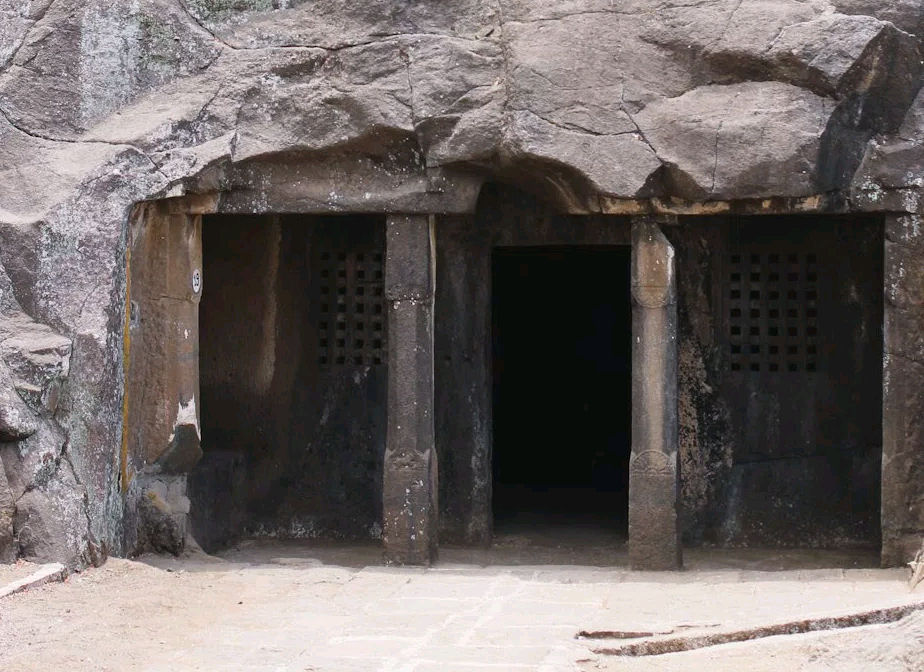
Cave No.19 of Satavahana king Kanha at the Nasik Caves, 1st century BCE.

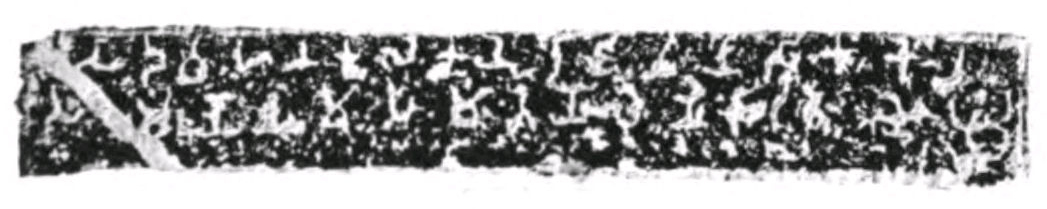
Inscription of king Kanha in cave No.19, Nasik Caves. This is one of the oldest known Satavahana inscription, circa 100–70 BCE. Brahmi script:
𑀲𑀸𑀤𑀯𑀸𑀳𑀦𑀓𑀼𑀮𑁂 𑀓𑀦𑁆𑀳𑁂𑀭𑀸𑀚𑀺𑀦𑀺 𑀦𑀸𑀲𑀺𑀓𑁂𑀦
𑀲𑀫𑀡𑁂𑀦 𑀫𑀳𑀸𑀫𑀸𑀢𑁂𑀡 𑀮𑁂𑀡 𑀓𑀸𑀭𑀢
Sādavāhanakule Kanhe rājini Nāsikakena Samaṇena mahāmāteṇa leṇa kārita
"Under King Kanha of the Satavahana family this cave has been caused to be made by the officer in charge of the Sramanas at Nasik".

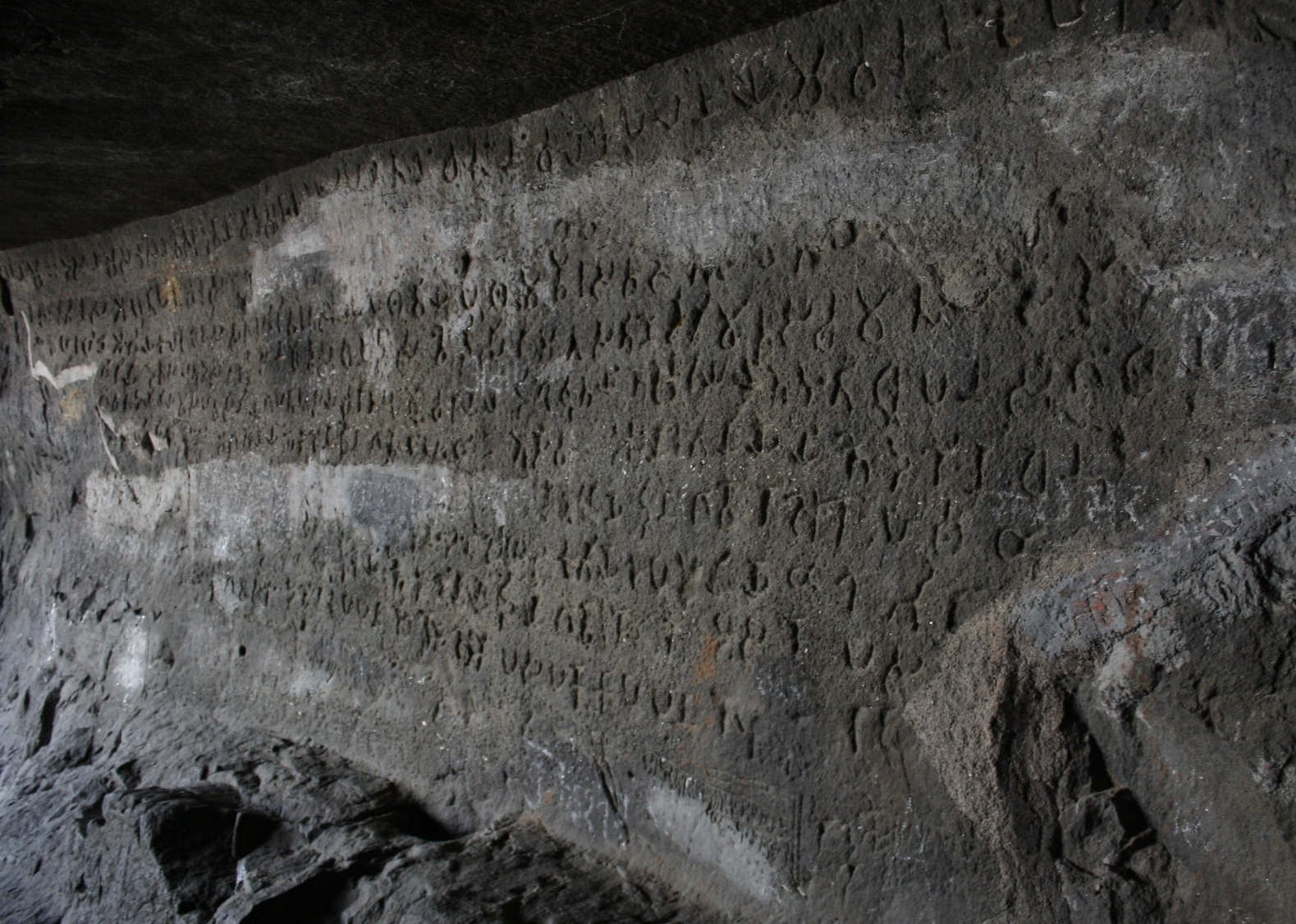
Naneghat inscription. Dated to 70-60 BCE, in the reign of Satakarni I.

Kanha's Pandavleni mentions the term maha-matra (officer-in-charge), which indicates that the early Satavahanas followed the Mauryan administrative model. C. Margabandhu theorised that the Satavahanas were called Andhras because they were natives of eastern Deccan (the Andhra region), although they first established their empire in western Deccan after having served as Mauryan subordinates. Himanshu Prabha Ray (1986) opposes this theory, stating that the Andhra was originally an ethnic term, and did not come to denote the geographical region of eastern Deccan until well after the Satavahana period. According to Vidya Dehejia, the writers of the Puranas (which could have been written after the Satavahana period) mistook the Satavahana presence in eastern Deccan as evidence for their origin in that region, and wrongly labelled them as "Andhra".

Puranas called the Satavahana kings as Andhras, Andhra-bhṛtya, or Andhra-jatiya. Andhras is both a tribal and a territorial name. The term Andhrabhrityas (Andhra servants) may imply two things, one being that the Andhras were originally servants of the Mauryas or the Sungas. The other one, as per some scholars is that the expression is taken to indicate the servants of some other Andhra rulers. These scholars also suggest Kannada origin for the Satavahanas meaning that the dynasty originated in present-day Karnataka, and initially owed allegiance to some Andhra rulers. A Satavahana inscription found on a slab of the upper drum (medhi) of the Kanaganahalli mahastupa mentions year 16 of Vasisthiputra Sri Chimuka Satavahana's reign, which can be dated from ca. 110 BCE. V. S. Sukthankar theorised that the territorial division Satavahani-Satahani (Satavahanihara or Satahani-rattha), in present-day Bellary district, was the homeland of the Satavahana family. However, Dr. Gopalchari challenged Sukthankar's theory by pointing out that not a single inscription of the early Satavahanas is found in Bellary District and that the only Satavahana inscription in Bellary District was that of Pulumavi, who belongs to the later-phase of Satavahana history. A stupa in Kanaganahalli village of Karnataka, dated between the first century BCE and first century CE, features limestone panels depicting portraits of Chimuka (Simuka), Satakani (Satakarni) and other Satavahana rulers. As per historian Parmanand Gupta, in the medieval times, Srisailam region or the Sriparvata area was known as Kannadu and Kannavisaya which is the contracted form of Satakarninadu and Satakarnivisaya, which seem to be identical with the territorial indicator Satavahanihara of the Myakadoni inscription of Pulumayi or the Satavahaniratta of the Hirahadagalli grant consisting of the Ballari region indicated to be the original homeland of the Satavahanas as per another historian V. S. Sukthankar.

According to Vasudev Vishnu Mirashi, the Satavahanas, likely originated in Western Maharashtra. Jain literature traces the Pratishthāna (present-day Paithan in the Marathwada region of Maharashtra) as the early Satvahana ruler's capital, Saktikumara. Similarly, the ancient geographer Ptolemy mentioned a king called Puļumāvi ruled from the same city sometime in around 140 CE. Now, the question is, why are these rulers referred to as "Andhra"? This can be explained through the dynastic lists recorded in the Puranas, which were likely compiled around 320 CE. He infers that these lists do not reference dynasties or rulers after this period, and the Satavahanas had already declined by circa 230 CE. By the time of their decline, the center of Satvahana power had shifted to the Andhra region. An inscription of the later king Gautamiputra Vijaya Satakarni was found at Nagarjunakonda in Andhra Pradesh, where he is said to have made Vijayapuri, the city mentioned as Nagarjunakonda, his capital. His coins also do not exist in Western Maharashtra, which was then the dominion of another king known as Chutukula Satakarni.

=== Varna ===
The varna of the dynasty is debated by modern scholars, who have variously argued for Shudra, Kshatriya, and Brahmana origins of the dynasty.

The Puranas call the founder of the Satavahana family a vṛṣala (Shudra or low-born).

The Nashik inscription of Gautami Balashri describes her son Gautamiputra Satakarni as eka-bamhana (Sanskrit: eka-brahmana). Some scholars, such as V.V. Mirashi, have interpreted the term as "sole Brahmana", and argued that Satavahanas were Brahmanas. Hem Chandra Raychaudhuri interprets the term as "unique Brahmana", and notes that the inscription also describes Gautamiputra as "the destroyer of the pride and conceit of Kshatriyas", which according to him strongly suggests that Gautamiputra claimed to be a Brahmana.

The critics of this theory point out that Gautamiputra's family had matrimonial relations with the non-Brahmana Shakas, and the Satavahanas could not have been Brahmanas because the same inscription also describes Gautamiputra as the one who stopped admixture of varnas (vinivatita chatu vana sankara). Historian V. Sundara Rama Sastry argues that the interpretation of the term "eka-bamhana" as "the only Brahmana" does not make sense as the king was obviously not the only member of his varna: instead, he interprets the term as an epithet indicating that the king "excelled even the Brahmans". Historian R. G. Bhandarkar interprets the term "the only protector" of the Brahmanas.

Some Jain works and the Dvātriṃśat-Puttalikā represent Shalivahana (whom some modern scholars identify as a Satavahana king) as of mixed Brahmana and Naga origin. Based on this, some scholars, such as D.C. Sircar, theorise that the Satavahanas were originally non-Brahmanas who started claiming Brahmana status after establishing matrimonial relations with some Brahmana families.

== History ==
Information about the Satavahanas comes from the Puranas, some Buddhist and Jain texts, the dynasty's inscriptions and coins, and foreign (Greek and Roman) accounts that focus on trade. The information provided by these sources is not sufficient to reconstruct the dynasty's history with absolute certainty. As a result, there are multiple theories about the Satavahana chronology.

=== Foundation ===
South Asia circa 150 BCE.

Simuka is mentioned as the first king in a list of royals in a Satavahana inscription at Naneghat. The various Puranas state that the first king of the dynasty ruled for 23 years, and mention his name variously as Sishuka, Sindhuka, Chhismaka, Shipraka, etc. These are believed to be corrupted spellings of Simuka, resulting from copying and re-copying of manuscripts. Simuka cannot be dated with certainty based on available evidence. Based on the following theories, the beginning of the Satavahana rule is dated variously from 271 BCE to 30 BCE. According to the Puranas, the first Andhra king overthrew the Kanva rule. He is named as Balipuccha in some texts. D. C. Sircar dated this event to c. 30 BCE, a theory supported by many other scholars.

The Matsya Purana mentions that the Andhra dynasty ruled for around 450 years. As the Satavahana rule ended in the early 3rd century, the beginning of their rule can be dated to the 3rd century BCE. The Indica of Megasthenes (350 – 290 BCE) mentions a powerful tribe named "Andarae", whose king maintained an army of 100,000 infantry, 2,000 cavalry and 1,000 elephants. If Andarae is identified with the Andhras, this can be considered additional evidence of Satavahana rule starting in the 3rd century BCE. The Brahmanda Purana states that "the four Kanvas will rule the earth for 45 years; then (it) will again go to the Andhras". Based on this statement, the proponents of this theory argue that the Satavahana rule began immediately after the Maurya rule, followed by a Kanva interregnum, and then, a revival of the Satavahana rule. According to one version of the theory Simuka succeeded the Mauryans. A variation of the theory is that Simuka was the person who restored the Satavahana rule by overthrowing the Kanvas; the compiler of the Puranas confused him with the founder of the dynasty.

Most modern scholars believe that the Satavahana ruler began in the 1st century BCE and lasted until the 2nd century CE. This theory is based on Puranic records as well as archaeological and numismatic evidence. The theory that dates their rule to an earlier period is now largely discredited because the various Puranas contradict each other, and are not fully supported by epigraphic or numismatic evidence.

The oldest Satavahana inscription is the one found on a slab of the upper drum (medhi) of the Kanaganahalli Great Stupa mentioning year 16 of Vasisthiputra Sri Chimuka Satavahana's reign, which can be dated from ca. 110 BCE.

𑀭𑀸𑀜𑁄 𑀲𑀺𑀭𑀺 𑀙𑀺𑀫𑀼𑀓 𑀲𑀸𑀢𑀯𑀸𑀳𑀦𑀲 𑀲𑁄𑀟𑁂 𑀯𑀙𑀭𑁂 𑁛𑁗 𑀫𑀸𑀢𑀺𑀲𑁂𑀓

Rano siri chimu(ka) sātavāhanasa soḍe vachare 10 6 mātiseka

"In the year sixteen 16 of King Siri Chimuka Sātavāhana"

— Kanaganahalli inscription of the 16th year of Simuka.

On another stone slab at Kanaganahalli, the king is possibly shown together with a Nagaraja, and the inscription reads:

𑀭𑀸𑀚𑀸 𑀲𑀺𑀭𑀺 𑀙𑀺𑀫𑀼𑀓𑁄 𑀲𑀸𑀤𑀯𑀸𑀳𑀦𑁄 𑀦𑀸𑀕𑀭𑀸𑀬 𑀲𑀔𑀥𑀸𑀪𑁄
Rājā Siri Chimuko Sādavāhano nāgarāya Sakhadhābho
"Lord King Simuka the Satavahana, Nagaraja Sakhadhābho"

— Kanaganahalli inscription of Simuka.

=== Early expansion ===
Sanchi donations (50 BCE- 0 CE)

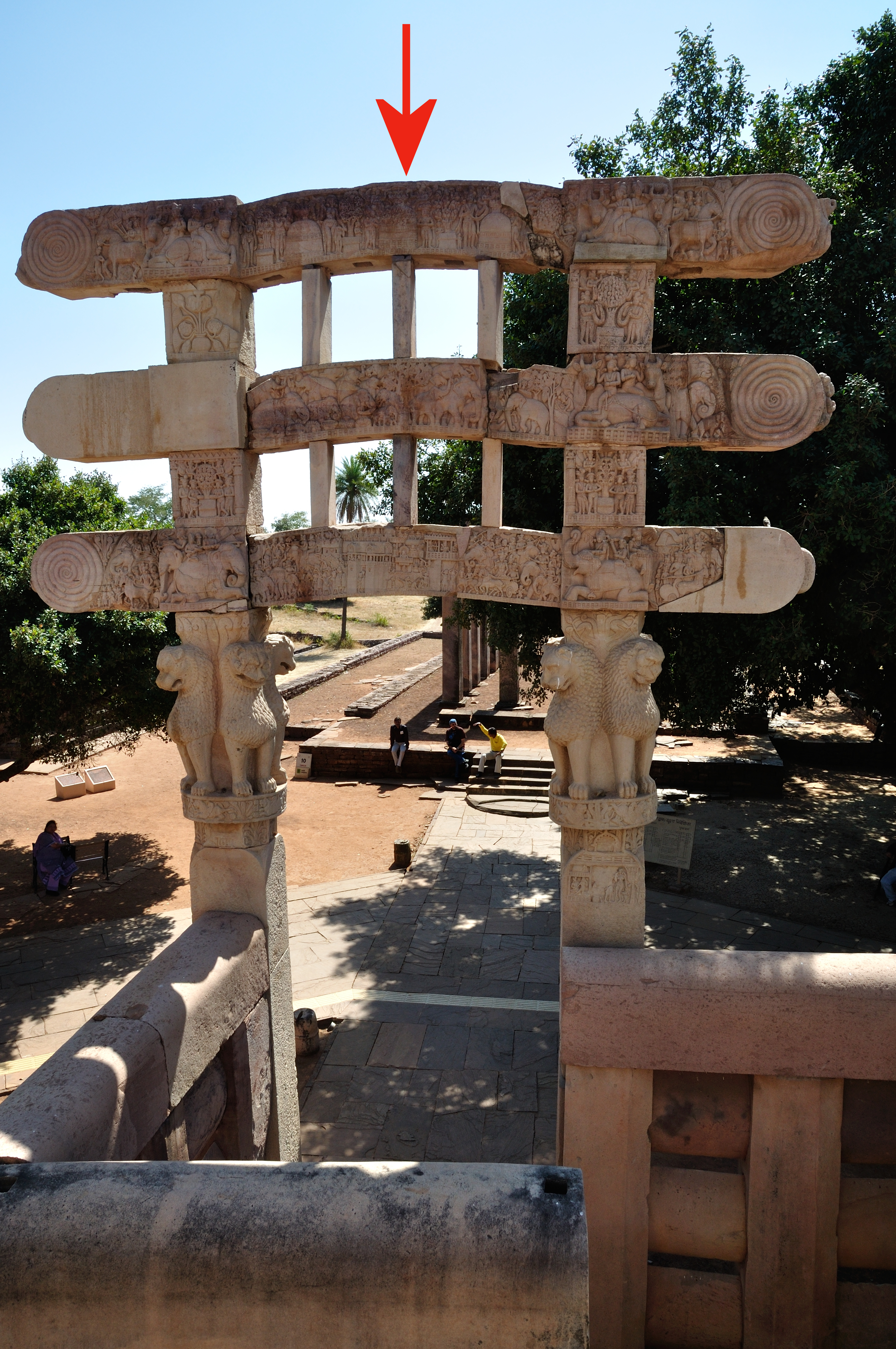
The southern gateway of the Great Stupa at Sanchi was, according to an inscription (see arrow), donated under the rule of "King Satakarni", probably Satakarni II.Sinopoli

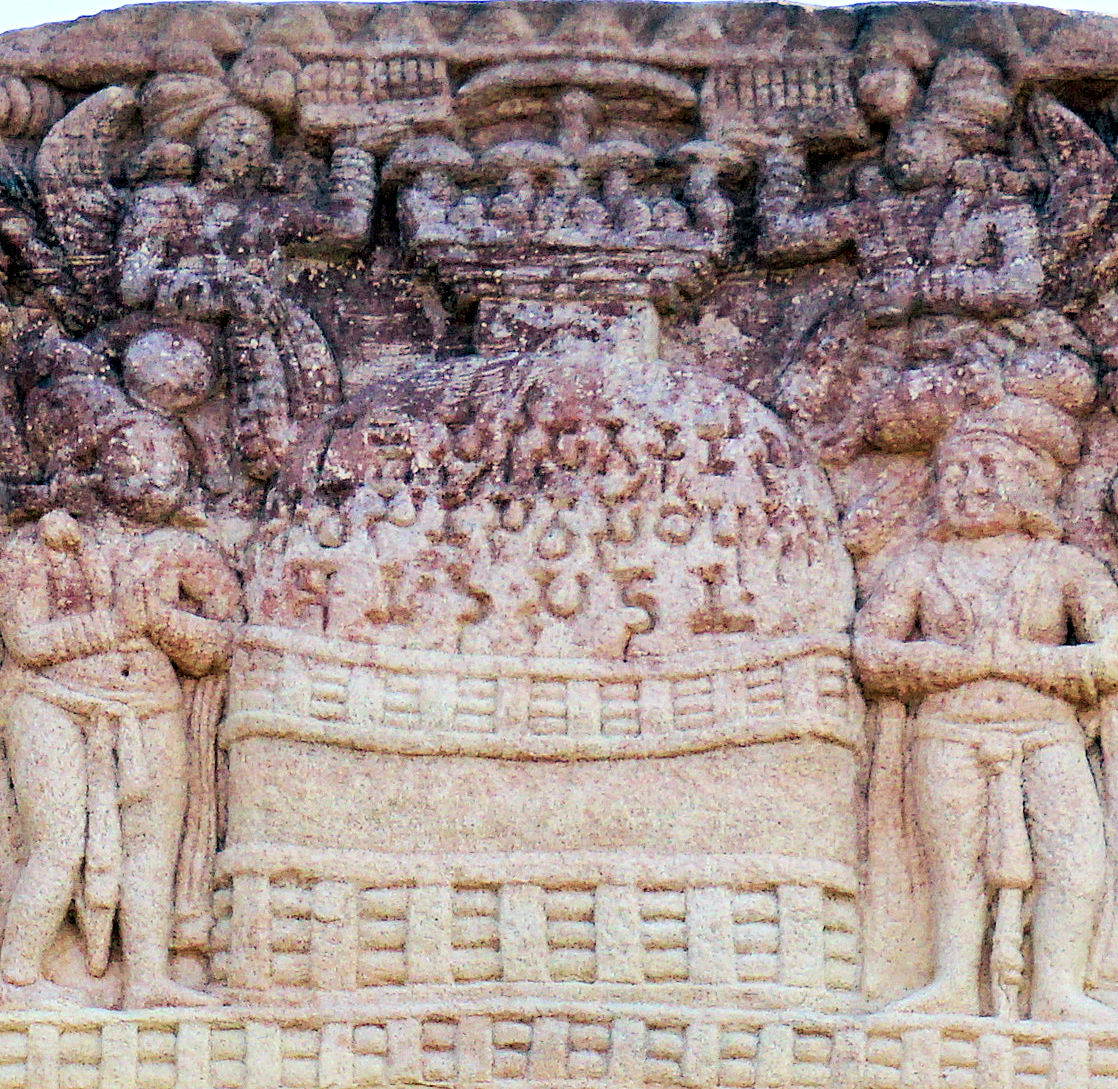
The inscription appears on the relief of a stupa at the center of the top architrave, at the rear. It is written in three lines in early Brahmi script over the dome of the stupa in this relief. Dated circa 50 BCE- 0 CE.

Text of the inscription:
𑀭𑀸𑀜𑁄 𑀲𑀺𑀭𑀺 𑀲𑀸𑀢𑀓𑀡𑀺𑀲 / 𑀆𑀯𑁂𑀲𑀡𑀺𑀲 𑀯𑀸𑀲𑀺𑀣𑀻𑀧𑀼𑀢𑀲 / 𑀆𑀦𑀁𑀤𑀲 𑀤𑀸𑀦𑀁
Rāño Siri Sātakaṇisa / āvesaṇisa vāsitḥīputasa / Ānaṁdasa dānaṁ
"Gift of Ananda, the son of Vasithi, the foreman of the artisans of rajan Siri Satakarni"

Simuka was succeeded by his brother Kanha (also known as Krishna), who extended the kingdom up to Nashik in the west. His successor Satakarni I conquered western Malwa, Anupa (Narmada valley) and Vidarbha, taking advantage of the turmoil caused by Greek invasions of northern India. He performed Vedic sacrifices including Ashvamedha and Rajasuya. Instead of the Buddhists, he patronised Brahmins and donated a substantial amount of wealth to them. The Hathigumpha inscription of the Kalinga king Kharavela mentions a king named "Satakani" or "Satakamini", who some identify with Satakarni I. The inscription describes dispatching of an army and Kharavela's threat to a city. Since the inscription is only partially legible, different scholars interpret the events described in the inscription differently. According to R. D. Banerji and Sailendra Nath Sen, Kharavela sent out an army against Satakarni. According to Bhagwal Lal, Satakarni wanted to avoid an invasion of his kingdom by Kharavela. So, he sent horses, elephants, chariots and men to Kharavela as a tribute. According to Sudhakar Chattopadhyaya, Kharavela's army diverted its course after failing to advance against Satakarni. According to Alain Daniélou, Kharavela was friendly with Satakarni, and only crossed his kingdom without any clashes.

Satakarni's successor Satakarni II ruled for 56 years, during which he captured eastern Malwa from the Shungas. This allowed him access to the Buddhist site of Sanchi, in which he is credited with the building of the decorated gateways around the original Mauryan Empire and Sunga stupas. Satakarni II is known from a dedicatory inscription at Sanchi. He was succeeded by Lambodara. The coins of Lambodara's son and successor Apilaka have been found in eastern Madhya Pradesh. However, Andrew Ollett argues that there is only one Satakarni, as the alleged first Satakarni is assigned ten years, and the second, fifty years by other scholars, but the only dated inscription of this king is Candankheda seal from his reign's year 30, around 60 BCE, and he ruled ca. 88–42 BCE.

==== Art of Sanchi ====
The Satavahanas contributed greatly to the embellishment of the Buddhist stupa of Sanchi. It was heavily repaired under King Satakarni II. The gateways and the balustrade were built after 70 BCE, and appear to have been commissioned by the Satavahanas. An inscription on the Southern Gateway records that it was the work of Satakarni II's royal architect Ananda. An inscription records the gift of one of the top architraves of the Southern Gateway by the artisans of the Satavahana Emperor Satakarni:

Gift of Ananda, the son of Vasithi, the foreman of the artisans of rajan Siri Satakarni

Sanchi under the Satavahanas; 1st century BCE/CE.
Architrave Architrave Yakshini. Pillar capital. Lion pillar capital. The Miracle of Walking in the air at Savrasti. Pipal tree. Miracle of the Buddha walking on the River Nairanjana Bimbisara with his royal cortege issuing from the city of Rajagriha to visit the Buddha. Foreigners making a dedication to the Great Stupa at Sanchi. Procession of king Suddhodana from Kapilavastu.

=== First Western Satraps invasion under Nahapana ===
Little is known about Apilaka's successors, except cryptic references to one Kuntala Satakarni. The next well-known ruler of the dynasty was Hāla, who composed Gaha Sattasai in Maharashtri Prakrit. Like Hala, his four successors also ruled for very short periods (a total of 12 years), indicating troubled times for the Satavahanas.

Epigraphic and numismatic evidence suggests that the Satavahanas earlier controlled the northern Deccan Plateau, the northern Konkan coastal plains, and the mountain passes connecting these two regions. During 15–40 CE, their northern neighbours – the Western Kshatrapas – extended their influence into these regions. The Western Kshatrapa ruler Nahapana is known to have ruled the former Satavahana territory, as attested by the inscriptions of his governor and son-in-law, Rishabhadatta.

=== First revival ===
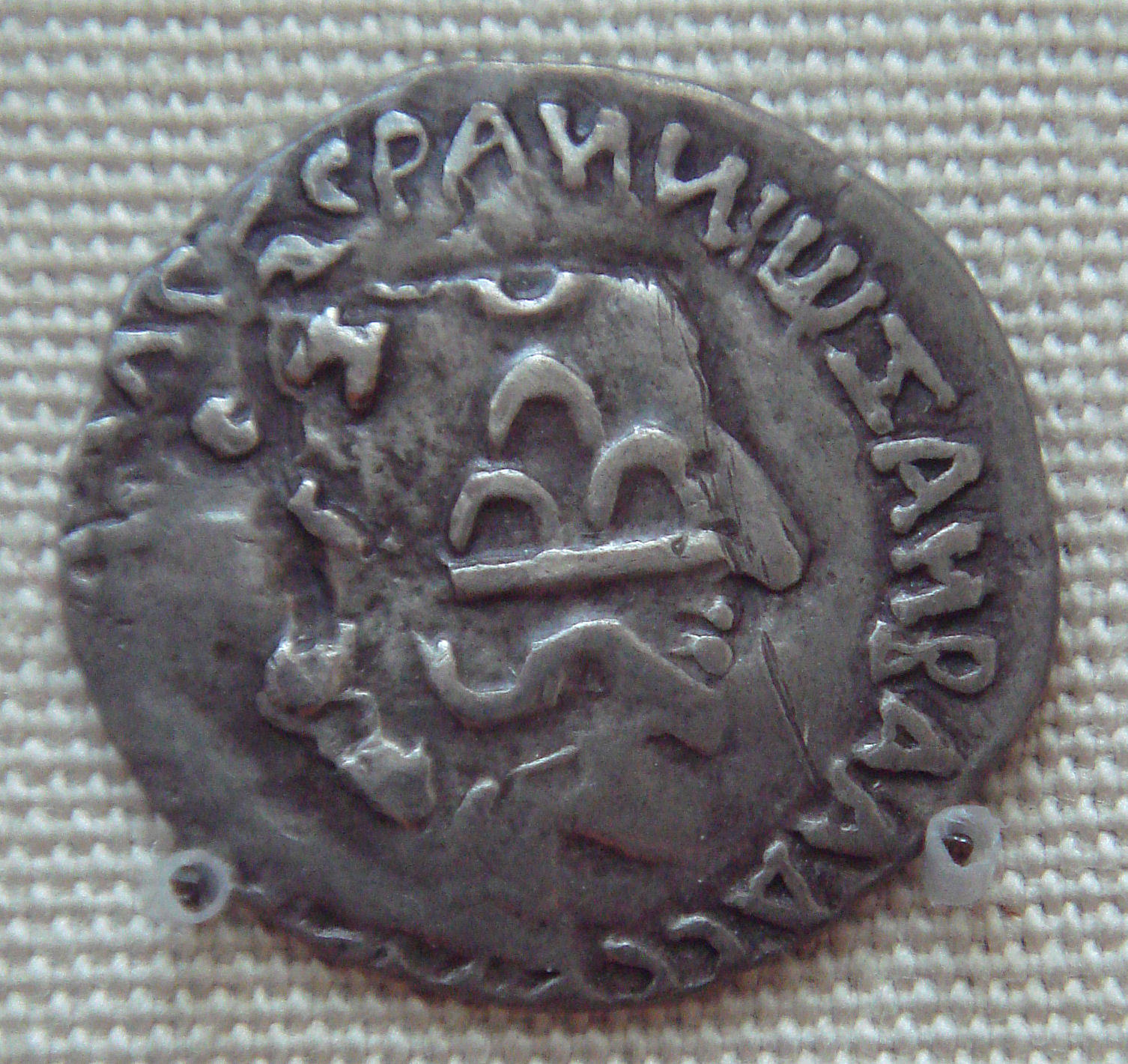
A coin of Nahapana restruck by the Satavahana king Gautamiputra Satakarni. Nahapana's profile and coin legend are still clearly visible.

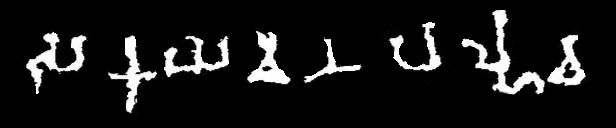
The defeated "Saka-Yavana-Palhava" (Brahmi script: 𑀲𑀓 𑀬𑀯𑀦 𑀧𑀮𑁆𑀳𑀯) mentioned in the Nasik cave 3 inscription of Queen Gotami Balasiri (end of line 5 of the inscription).

The Satavahana power was revived by Gautamiputra Satakarni, who is considered the greatest of the Satavahana rulers. Charles Higham dates his reign c. 103 – c. 127 CE. S. Nagaraju dates it 106–130 CE, the new consensus is shared by Shailendra Bhandare, Akira Shimada, and Oskar von Hinuber, who regard Gautamiputra Satakarni's reign was ca. 60–85 CE, as it is evident from history that "Gautamiputra Saatakarni" in the year 78 CE defeated Vikramaditya of Ujjain, which in turn was celebrated and named "Yug Aadi" means Beginning of New Era (New Year for Andhra, Karnataka, Maharashtra (Gudi padwa), Telangana states). Ever since these states people followed Saatavaahana calendar. Andrew Ollett considers it as 60–84 CE. The king defeated by him appears to have been the Western Kshatrapa ruler Nahapana, as suggested by Nahapana's coins overstuck with names and titles of Gautamiputra. The Nashik prashasti inscription of Gautamiputra's mother Gautami Balashri, dated to the 20th year after his death, records his achievements. The most liberal interpretation of the inscription suggests that his kingdom extended from the present-day Rajasthan in the north to Krishna river in the south, and from Saurashtra in the west to Kalinga in the east. He assumed the titles Raja-Raja (King of Kings) and Maharaja (Great King), and was described as the Lord of Vindhya.

During the last years of his reign, his administration was apparently handled by his mother, which could have been a result of an illness or military preoccupation. According to the Nasik inscription made by his mother Gautami Balashri, he was the one ...

… who crushed down the pride and conceit of the Kshatriyas; who destroyed the Sakas (Western Satraps), Yavanas (Indo-Greeks) and Pahlavas (Indo-Parthians),... who rooted out the Khakharata family (the Kshaharata family of Nahapana); who restored the glory of the Satavahana race.

— Inscription of Queen Mother Gautami Balashri at Cave No.3 of the Pandavleni Caves in Nashik.

Gautamiputra was succeeded by his son Vasisthiputra Sri Pulamavi (or Pulumayi). According to Sailendra Nath Sen, Pulumavi ruled from 96 to 119 CE. According to Charles Higham, he ascended the throne around 110 CE, according to Shailendra Bhandare, Akira Shimada, and Oskar von Hinuber Vasisthiputra Sri Pulamavi ruled ca. 85–125 CE, and Andrew Ollett considers it to be ca. 84–119 CE. Pulumavi features in a large number of Satavahana inscriptions and his coins have been found distributed over a wide area. This indicates that he maintained Gautamiputra's territory, and ruled a prosperous kingdom. He is believed to have added the Bellary region to Satakarni's kingdom. His coins featuring ships with double mast have been found on the Coromandel Coast, indicating involvement in maritime trade and naval power. The old stupa at Amaravati was perhaps renovated during his reign. though recent scholarship tends to spread the dates of this wider.

=== Second Western Satraps invasion under Rudradaman I ===
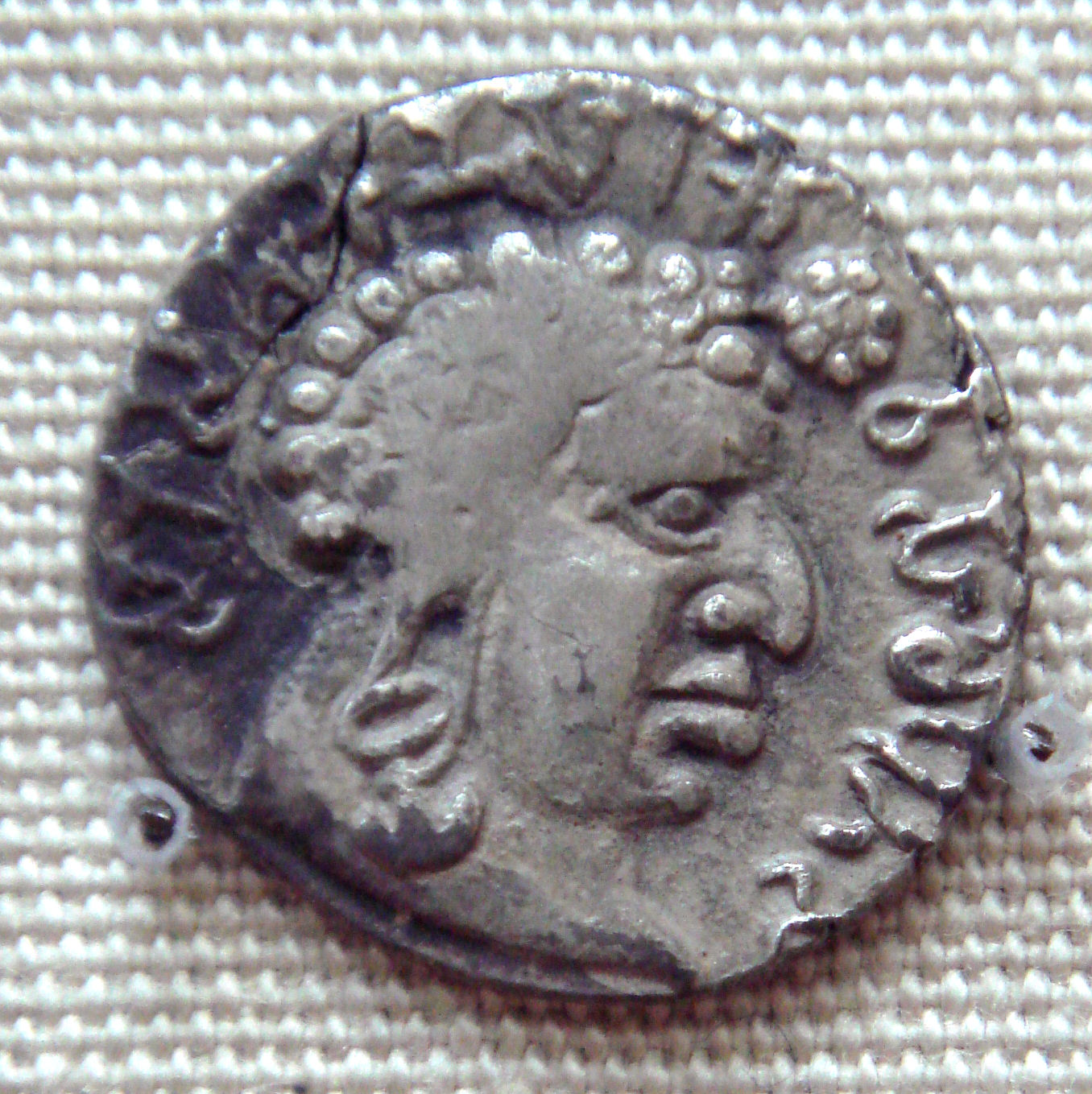
Coin of Vashishtiputra Satakarni.

Pulumavi's successor was his brother Vashishtiputra Satakarni. According to S. N. Sen he ruled during 120–149 CE; according to Charles Higham, his regnal years spanned 138–145 CE. He entered into a marriage alliance with the Western Satraps, marrying the daughter of Rudradaman I.

The Junagadh inscription of Rudradaman I states that he defeated Satakarni, the lord of Dakshinapatha (Deccan), twice. It also states that he spared the life of the defeated ruler because of close relations:

"Rudradaman (...) who obtained good report because he, in spite of having twice in fair fight completely defeated Satakarni, the lord of Dakshinapatha, on account of the nearness of their connection did not destroy him."

— Junagadh rock inscription

According to D. R. Bhandarkar and Dineshchandra Sircar, the ruler defeated by Rudradaman was Gautamiputra Satakarni. However, E. J. Rapson believed that the defeated ruler was his son Vasishthiputra Pulumavi. Shailendra Nath Sen and Charles Higham believe that the defeated ruler was Vashishtiputra's successor Shivaskanda or Shiva Sri Pulumayi (or Pulumavi).

As a result of his victories, Rudradaman regained all the former territories previously held by Nahapana, except for the extreme south territories of Pune and Nasik. Satavahana dominions were limited to their original base in the Deccan and eastern central India around Amaravati.

=== Second revival ===
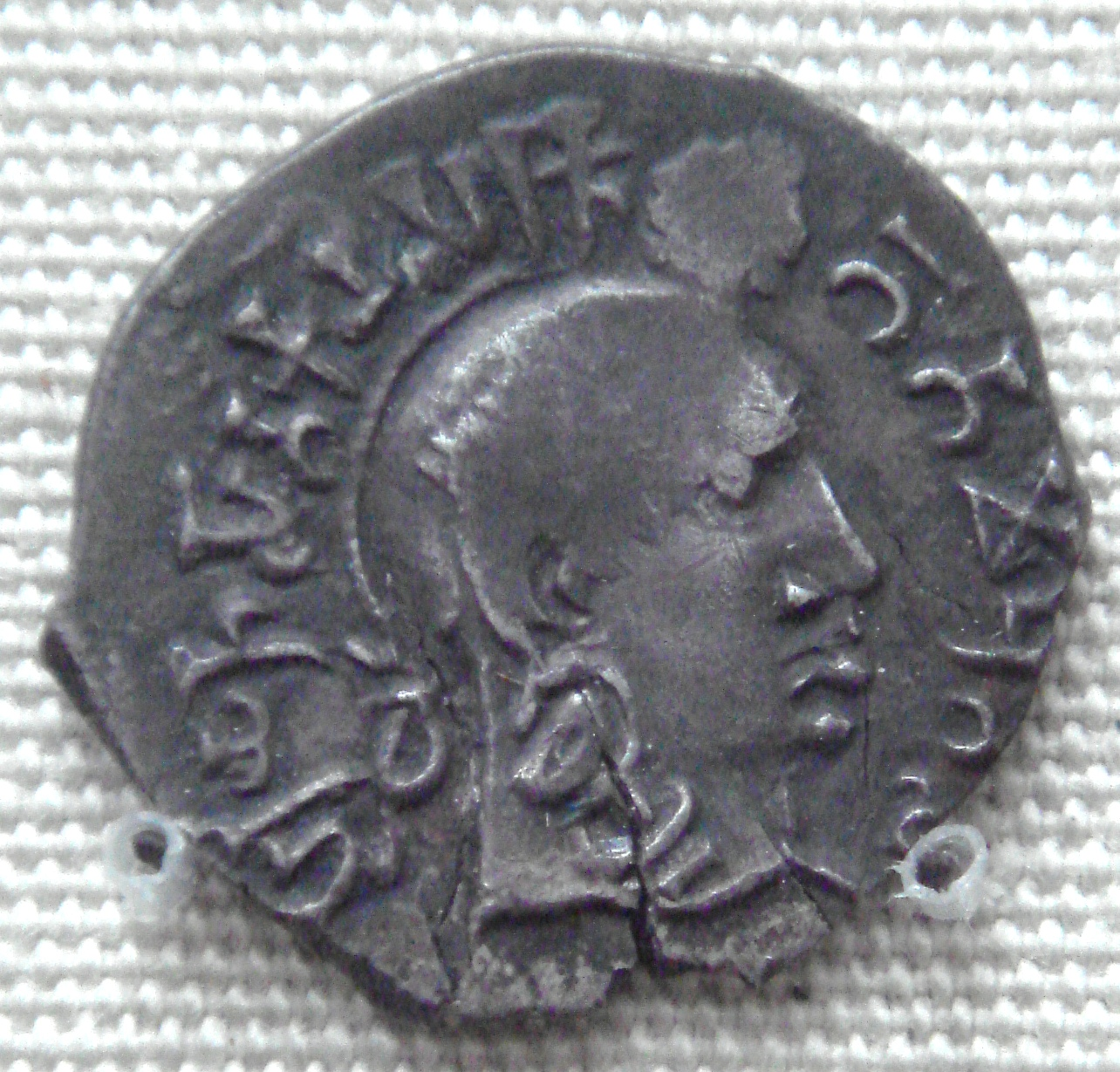
Coin of Yajna Sri Satakarni, British Museum.

Sri Yajna Sātakarni, the last person belonging to the main Satavahana dynastic line, briefly revived the Satavahana rule. According to S. N. Sen, he ruled during 170–199 CE. Charles Higham dates the end of his reign to 181 CE. His coins feature images of ships, which suggest naval and marine trade success. Wide distribution of his coins, and inscriptions at Nashik, Kanheri and Guntur indicate that his rule extended over both eastern and western parts of Deccan. He recovered much of the territory lost the Western Kshatrapas, and issued silver coinage, imitating them. During the last years of his reign, the Abhiras captured the northern parts of the kingdom, around Nashik region.

=== Decline ===
After Yajna Satakarni, the dynasty was soon extinguished following the rise of its feudatories, perhaps on account of a decline in central power. On the other hand, the Western Satraps would continue to prosper for the next two centuries, until their extinction by the Gupta Empire. Yajna Sri was succeeded by Madhariputra Swami Isvarasena. The next king Vijaya ruled for 6 years. His son Vasishthiputra Sri Chadha Satakarni ruled for 10 years. Pulumavi IV, the last king of the main line, ruled until c. 225 CE. During his reign, several Buddhist monuments were constructed at sites including Nagarjunakonda and Amaravati. Madhya Pradesh was also part of his kingdom.

After the death of Pulumavi IV, the Satavahana empire fragmented into five smaller kingdoms:

1. Northern part, ruled by a collateral branch of the Satavahanas (which ended in early 4th century)
2. Western part around Nashik, ruled by the Abhira dynasty
3. Eastern part (Krishna-Guntur region), ruled by the Andhra Ikshvakus
4. South-western parts (northern Karanataka), ruled by the Chutus of Banavasi
5. South-eastern part, ruled by the Pallavas

== Territorial extent ==
Main polities in Asia, circa -100

The Satavahana territory included northern Deccan region, spanning the present-day Andhra Pradesh, Maharashtra and Telangana states. At times, their rule also extended to present-day Gujarat, Karnataka and Madhya Pradesh. The Nashik prashasti inscription issued by Gautami Balashri, the mother of Gautamiputra Satakarni, claims that her son ruled an extensive territory that stretched from Gujarat in the north to northern Karnataka in the south. It is not clear if Gautamiputra had effective control over these claimed territories. In any case, historical evidence suggests that his control over these territories did not last long. Moreover, this realm was not continuous: many areas in this region remained under the control of the hunter-gatherers and other tribal communities.

As per historian M. Govinda Pai, Ptolemy (100–170 CE) states that when Siro Polemaios (Vasishthiputra Sri Pulumayi) was ruling from his capital Paithan in the north (reign c. 85-125 CE), another Satavahana prince called Baleokouros or Baleokoura (Vilivayakura) was ruling from Hippokoura (Huvina Hipparagi) of Basavana Bagewadi taluk of Vijayapura district of present Karnataka in the south who was none other than his own son. Pai identifies this prince Vilivaya-kura as another form of Vilivaya Kumara (meaning the son of Vilivaya), and he goes on to prove that Vilivaya is indeed merely another rendering of Pulumayi which was transformed as per Prakrit rules, the spoken form of this language during that period, and due to common parlance. Thus, Vilivayakura means a son of Pulumayi who was ruling from Huvina Hipparagi in present Karnataka. Pai identifies all the 10 cities mentioned by Ptolemy as lying between the river Benda (or Binda) or Bhima river in the north and Banaouasei (Banavasi) in the south, viz. Nagarouris (Nagur), Tabaso (Tavasi), Inde (Indi), Tiripangalida (Gadhinglaj), Hippokoura (Huvina Hipparagi), Soubouttou (Savadi), Sirimalaga (Malkhed), Kalligeris (Kalkeri), Modogoulla (Mudgal) and Petirgala (Pattadakal), as being located in Northern Karnataka.

The Satavahana capital kept shifting with time. The Nashik inscription describes Gautamiputra as the lord of Benakataka, suggesting that this was the name of his capital. Ptolemy (2nd century CE) mentioned Pratishthana (modern Paithan) as the capital of Pulumavi. At other times, the Satavahana capitals included Dharanikota and Junnar. M. K. Dhavalikar theorised that the original Satavahana capital was located at Junnar, but had to be moved to Pratishthana because of Saka-Kushana incursions from the north-west.

Several Satavahana-era inscriptions record grants to religious monasteries. The settlements most frequently mentioned as the residences of donors in these inscriptions include the sea ports of Sopara, Kalyan, Bharuch, Kuda (unidentified), and Chaul. The most frequently mentioned inland settlements include Dhanyakatakam/Dharanikota, Junnar, Nashik, Paithan, and Karad.

Other important Satavahana sites in western Deccan include Govardhana, Nevasa, Ter, and Vadgaon-Madhavpur. The ones in eastern Deccan include Amaravati, Dhulikatta, Kotalingala and Peddabankur.

== Administration ==
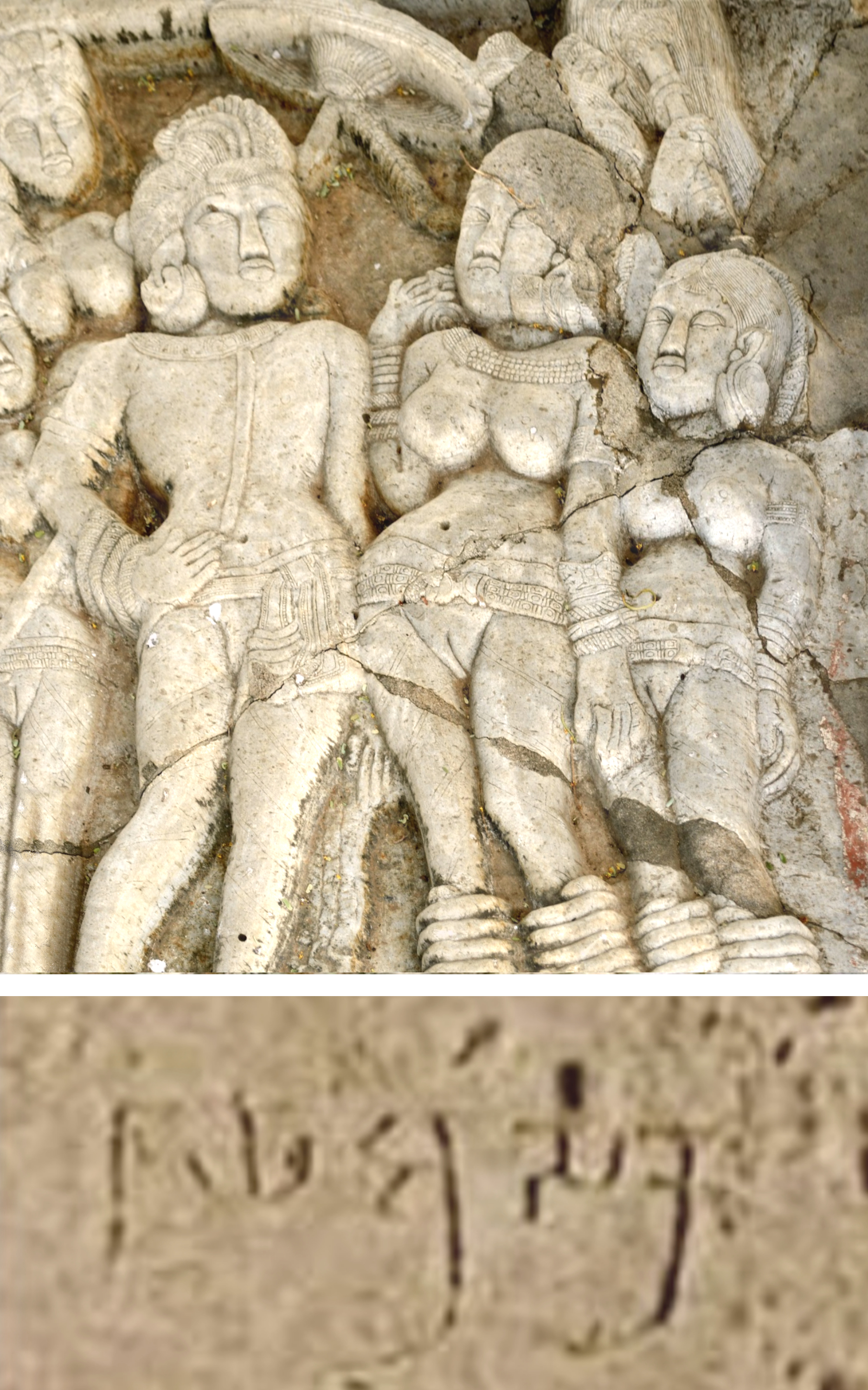
Ashoka with his Queens, at Sannati (Kanaganahalli Stupa), 1st-3rd century CE. The inscription "Rāya Asoko" (𑀭𑀸𑀬 𑀅𑀲𑁄𑀓𑁄, "King Ashoka") in Brahmi script is carved on the relief.

The Satavahanas followed the administration guidelines of the Shastras. Their government was less top-heavy than that of the Mauryans, and featured several levels of feudatories:

- Rajan, the hereditary rulers
- Rajas, petty princes who struck coins in their own names
- Maharathis, hereditary lords who could grant villages in their own names and maintained matrimonial relations with the ruling family
- Mahabhojas
- Mahasenapati (civil administrator under Pulumavi II; governor of a janapada under Pulumavi IV)
- Mahatalavara ("great watchman")

The royal princes (kumaras) were appointed as viceroys of the provinces.

The ahara appears to have been the largest geographical subdivision of the Satavahana polity. Several inscriptions refer to aharas named after the governors appointed to rule them (e.g. Govardhanahara, Mamalahara, Satavanihara and Kapurahara). This suggests that the Satavahanas attempted to build a formal administrative and revenue collection structure.

The inscriptions of Gautamiputra Satakarni suggest the existence of a bureaucratic structure, although it is not certain how stable and effective this structure was. For example, two inscriptions from Nashik Cave 11 record donations of agricultural land to ascetic communities. They state that the ascetics would enjoy tax exemption and non-interference from the royal officials. The first inscription states that the grant was approved by Gautamiputra's minister Sivagupta on the king's verbal orders, and preserved by the "great lords". The second inscription records a grant by Gautamiputra and his mother, and mentions Syamaka as the minister of the Govardhana ahara. It states that the charter was approved by a woman named Lota, who according to archaeologist James Burgess' interpretation, was the chief lady-in-waiting of Gautamiputra's mother.

The Satavahana-era inscriptions mention three types of settlements: nagara (city), nigama (market town) and gāma (village).

According to Sastri, "the Satavahanas were described as 'lords of the three oceans' and promoted overseas colonization and trade. Under them, Buddhist art attained the superb forms of beauty and elegance preserved to this day in the cave-temples of western India and the survivals from the stupa of Amaravati, Goli, Nagarjunikonda". This tradition was followed by successors of Satavahana in the eastern and western Deccan.

== Economy ==
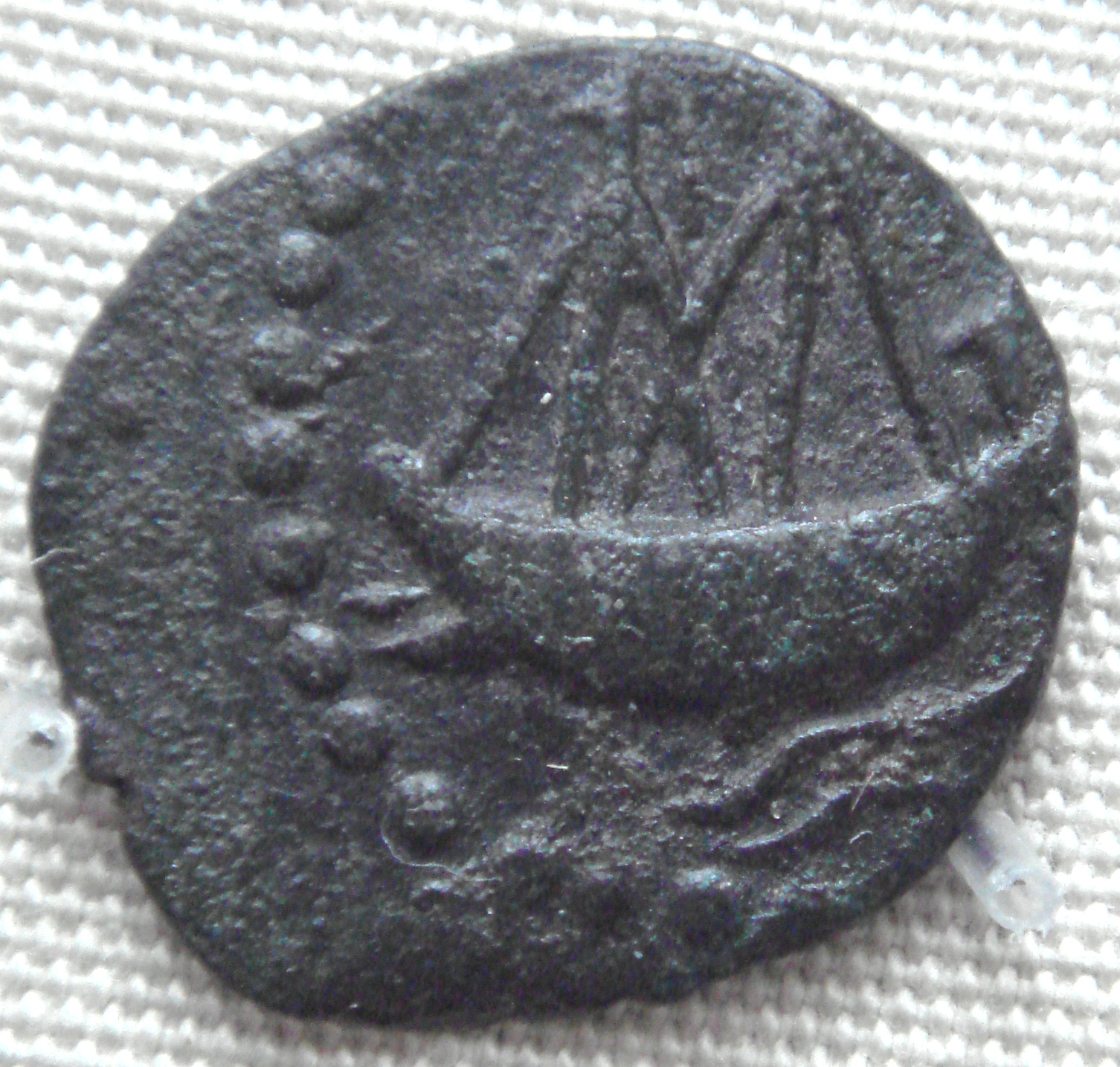
Indian ship on lead coin of Vasisthiputra Sri Pulamavi, testimony to the naval, seafaring and trading capabilities of the Satavahanas during the 1st–2nd century CE.

The Satavahanas participated in (and benefited from) economic expansion through intensification of agriculture, increased production of other commodities, and trade within and beyond the Indian subcontinent.

During the Satavahana period, several large settlements emerged in the fertile areas, especially along the major rivers. The amount of land under agricultural use also expanded significantly, as a result of forest clearance and construction of irrigation reservoirs.

The exploitation of sites with mineral resources may have increased during the Satavahana period, leading to the emergence of new settlements in these areas. Such sites facilitated commerce and crafts (such as ceramic ware). The increased craft production during the Satavahana period is evident from archaeological discoveries at sites such as Kotalingala, as well as epigraphic references to artisans and guilds.

The Satavahanas controlled the Indian sea coast, and as a result, they dominated the growing Indian trade with the Roman Empire. The Periplus of the Erythraean Sea mentions two important Satavahana trade centres: Pratishthana and Tagara. Other important urban centres included Kondapur, Banavasi and Madhavpur. Nanaghat was the site of an important pass that linked the Satavahana capital Pratishthana to the sea.

== Religion ==
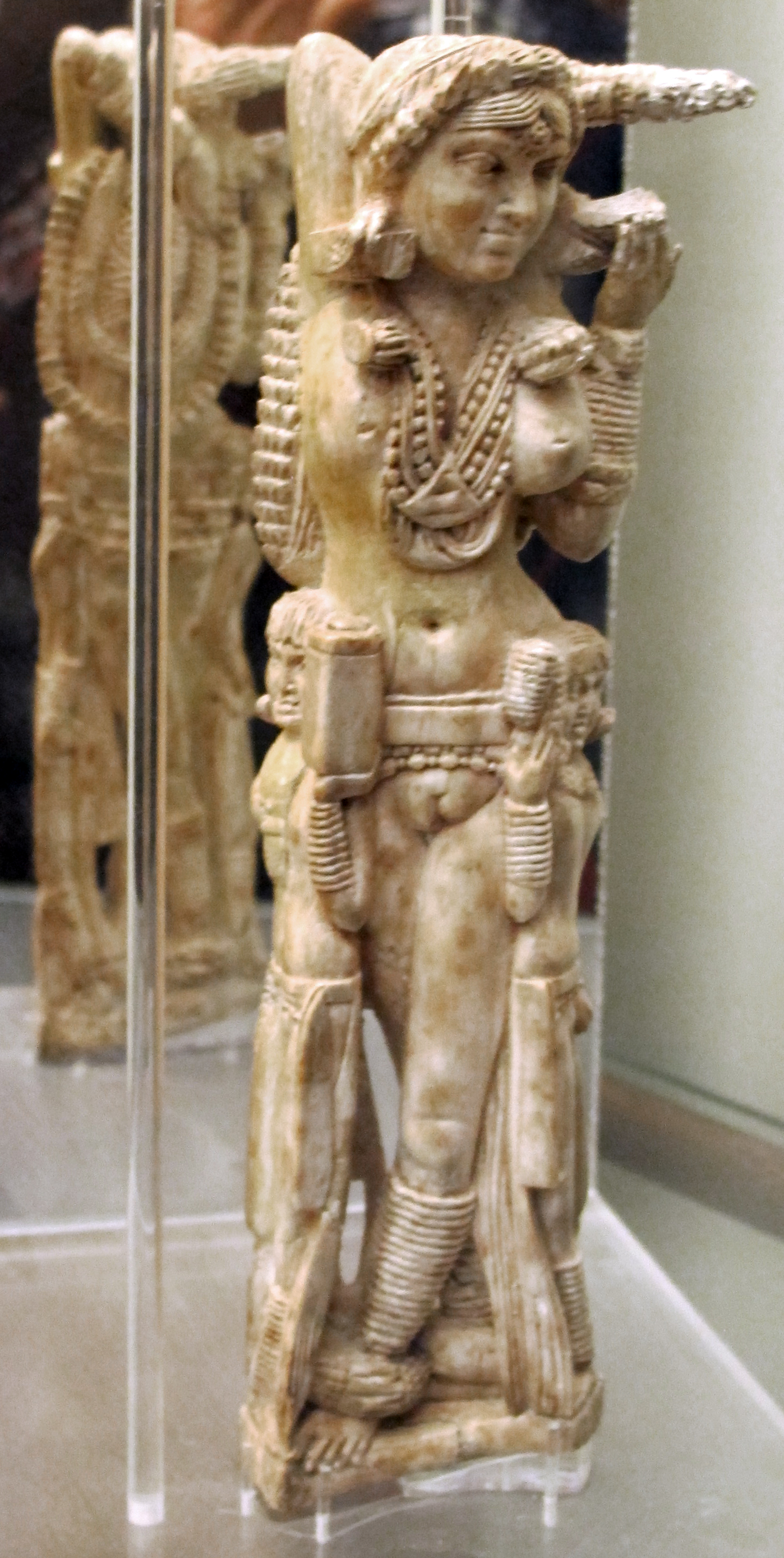
The Pompeii Lakshmi ivory statuette was found in the ruin of Pompeii (destroyed in an eruption of Mount Vesuvius in 79 CE). It is thought to have come from Bhokardan in the Satavahana realm in the first half of the 1st century CE. It testifies to Indo-Roman trade relations in the beginning of our era.

The Satavahanas patronised Brahmanism and Mahayana Buddhism, performed Vedic sacrifices, and claimed Brahmanical status. They also made generous donations to Buddhist monasteries. The lay people in the Satavahana period perhaps generally did not exclusively support a particular religious group .

The Naneghat inscription of Nayanika, recorded on the walls of a cave, mentions that her husband Satakarni I performed several Vedic sacrifices, including ashvamedha (horse sacrifice), rajasuya (royal consecration), and agnyadheya (fire ceremony). The inscription also records substantial fees paid to Brahmin priests and attendees for these sacrifices. For example, 10,001 cows were granted for the Bhagala-Dasaratra sacrifice; and 24,400 coins were granted for another sacrifice, whose name is not clear.

A number of Buddhist monastic sites emerged in the Deccan region during the Satavahana period. However, the exact relations between these monasteries and the Satavahana government is not clear. The Pandavleni Caves inscription issued during the reign of Kanha states that the cave was excavated by maha-matra (officer-in-charge) of the shramanas (non-Vedic ascetics). Based on this, Sudhakar Chattopadhyaya concludes that Kanha favoured Buddhism, and had an administrative department dedicated to the welfare of Buddhist monks. The most common among donors were merchants, and many of the monasteries were located along the important trade routes. The merchants probably donated to the monasteries, because these sites facilitated trade by serving as rest houses, and possibly by directly participating in the trade. The monasteries appear to have been an important venue for displaying charitable donations, including the donations made to non-Buddhists (especially Brahmins).

== Language ==
Most of the known Satavahana inscriptions and coin legends are in a Middle Indo-Aryan language. These inscriptions are often termed "Prakrit", defined broadly to include every Middle Indo-Aryan language that is "not exactly Sanskrit". The language of the inscriptions is actually closer to Sanskrit than to the literary Prakrit, Maharashtri Prakrit, used in the Gaha Sattasai anthology. Considered an ancestor language of modern Marathi, Maharashtri Prakrit was adopted as a courtly, or official, language by the Satavahana dynasty.

The Satvahanas also used Sanskrit in political inscriptions, but this was rare. A fragmentary inscription found close to the Nashik prashasti of Gautamiputra Satakarni uses Sanskrit verses in vasanta-tilaka metre to describe a deceased king (probably Gautamiputra). A Sanskrit inscription found at Sannati probably refers to Gautamiputra Shri Satakarni, one of whose coins also features a Sanskrit legend.

According to Gunadhya, besides Sanskrit and Prakrit there is another language called 'Desi' which may mean the native language or the language of common man. Commenting on the Desi language Dr.D.C.Sircar remarks "It was apparently Early Telugu which was in older times very much closer to Tamil than it is now was the mother tongue of the common people". Later Satavahana kings like Gauthamiputra Satakarni, Vastistiputra pulamovi and Yajna Satakarni had their names in two languages i.e.; Prakrit and Desi (possibly Old Tamil), a native language.

The Satavahanas also issued bilingual coins featuring Middle Indo-Aryan language on one side, and Desi language (possibly Old Tamil) on the other.

== Inscriptions ==
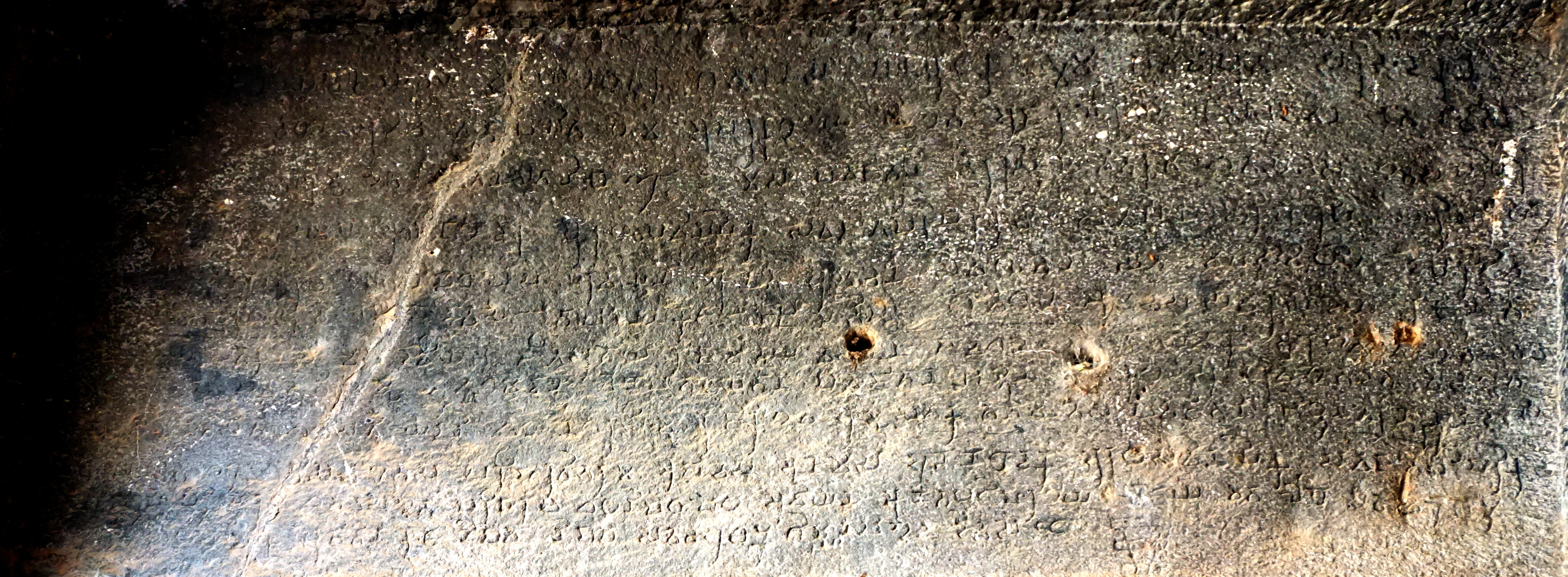
Inscription of Gautamiputra Satakarni, Nasik Caves No.3, Inscription No.4. Circa 150 CE.

Several Brahmi script inscriptions are available from the Satavahana period, but most of these record donations to Buddhist institutions by individuals, and do not provide much information about the dynasty. The inscriptions issued by the Satavahana royals themselves also primarily concern religious donations, although some of them provide some information about the rulers and the imperial structure.

The earliest extant Satavahana inscription is from Nashik Cave 19, which states that the cave was commissioned by Mahamatra Saman of Nashik during the reign of king Kanha.

At Naneghat, an inscription issued by Nayanika, the widow of Satakarni I, has been found. It records Nayanika's lineage and mentions the Vedic sacrifices performed by the royal family. Another inscription at Naneghat comprises names of Satavahana royals, appearing as labels over their bas-relief portraits. The portraits are now completely eroded, but the inscription is believed to be contemporary to Nayanika's inscription on a paleographic basis.

The next oldest Satavahana-era inscription appears on a sculpted gateway element of Stupa 1 at Sanchi. It states that the element was donated by Ananda, who was the son of Siri Satakarni's foreman of artisans. This inscription is probably from the reign of Satakarni II.

== Coinage ==
Satavahana bilingual coinage in Prakrit and Dravidian (possibly Old Tamil) (c.150 CE)
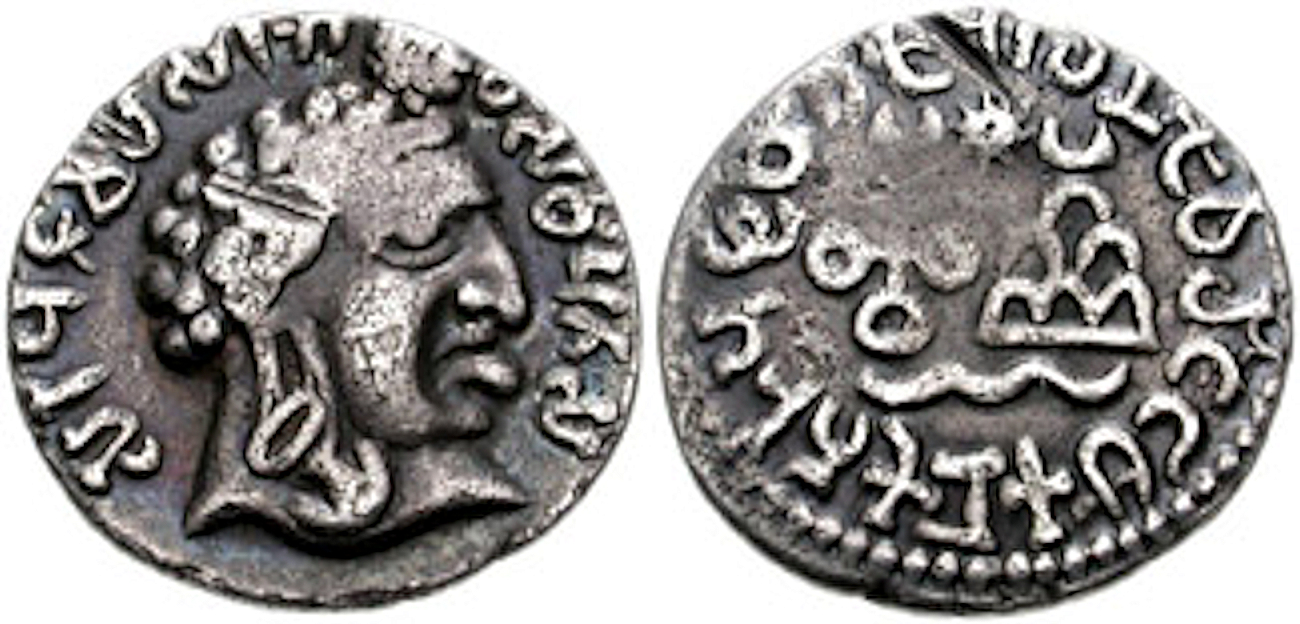

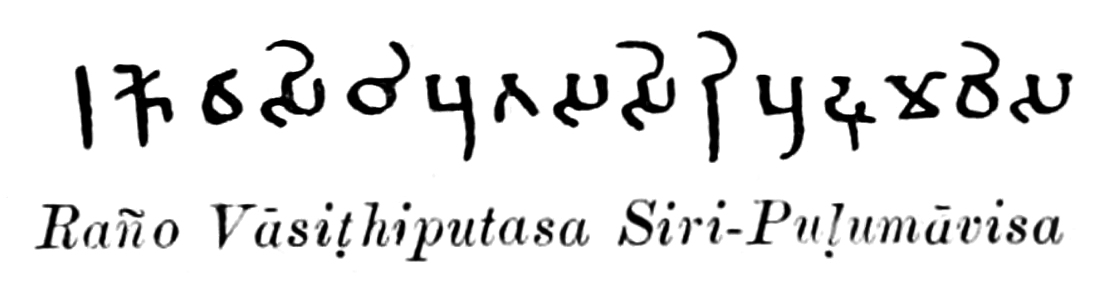
Bilingual coinage of Sri Vasishthiputra Pulumavi in Prakrit and Dravidian (possibly Old Tamil), and transcription of the obverse Prakrit legend.

Obverse: Portrait of the king. Legend in Prakrit in the Brahmi script (starting at 12 o'clock):
𑀭𑀜𑁄 𑀯𑀸𑀲𑀺𑀣𑀺𑀧𑀼𑀢𑀲 𑀲𑀺𑀭𑀺 𑀧𑀼𑀎𑀼𑀫𑀸𑀯𑀺𑀲
Raño Vāsiṭhiputasa Siri-Puḷumāvisa
"Of King Lord Pulumavi, son of Vasishthi"

Reverse: Ujjain and arched-hill symbols. Legend in Dravidian (much more closer to Tamil, and the Dravidian script, essentially similar to the Brahmi script (starting at 12 o'clock):
𑀅𑀭𑀳𑀡𑀓𑀼 𑀯𑀸𑀳𑀺𑀣𑀺 𑀫𑀸𑀓𑀡𑀓𑀼 𑀢𑀺𑀭𑀼 𑀧𑀼𑀮𑀼𑀫𑀸𑀯𑀺𑀓𑀼
Arahaṇaku Vāhitti Mākaṇaku Tiru Pulumāviku
or: Aracanaku Vācitti Makaṇaku Tiru Pulumāviku
"Of King Tiru Pulumavi, son of Vasishthi"

The Satavahanas were the earliest Indian rulers to issue their own coins with portraits of their rulers, starting with king Gautamiputra Satakarni, a practice derived from that of the Western Kshatrapas he defeated. The Western Satraps themselves had been following the features of the coins of the Indo-Greek kings to the northwest.

Thousands of lead, copper and potin Satavahana coins have been discovered in the Deccan region; a few gold and silver coins are also available. These coins do not feature uniform design or size, and suggest that multiple minting locations existed within the Satavahana territory, leading to regional differences in coinage.

The coin legends of the Satavahanas, in all areas and all periods, used a Prakrit dialect without exception. In addition, some reverse coin legends are in Dravidian (much more similar to Tamil than Telugu, in the Dravidian script (similar to the Brahmi script apart from a few variations).

Several coins carry titles or matronyms that were common to multiple rulers (e.g. Satavahana, Satakarni, and Pulumavi), so the number of rulers attested by coinage cannot be determined with certainty. The names of 16 to 20 rulers appear on the various coins. Some of these rulers appear to be local elites rather than the Satavahana monarchs.

The Satavahana coins give unique indications as to their chronology, language, and even facial features (curly hair, long ears and strong lips). They issued mainly lead and copper coins; their portrait-style silver coins were usually struck over coins of the Western Kshatrapa kings. The Satavahana coins also display various traditional symbols, such as elephants, lions, horses and chaityas (stupas), as well as the "Ujjain symbol", a cross with four circles at the end.

=== Other examples ===
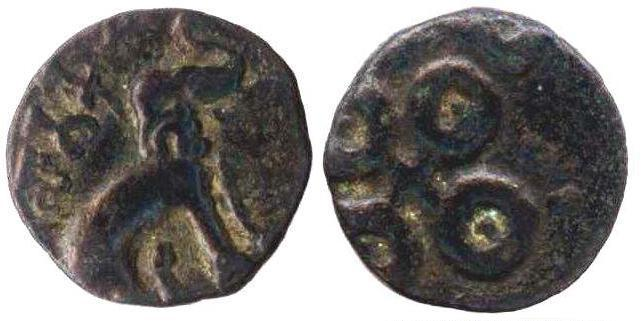
Early Satavahana coinage, Satakarni issue, Maharashtra – Vidarbha type, 1st century BCE.

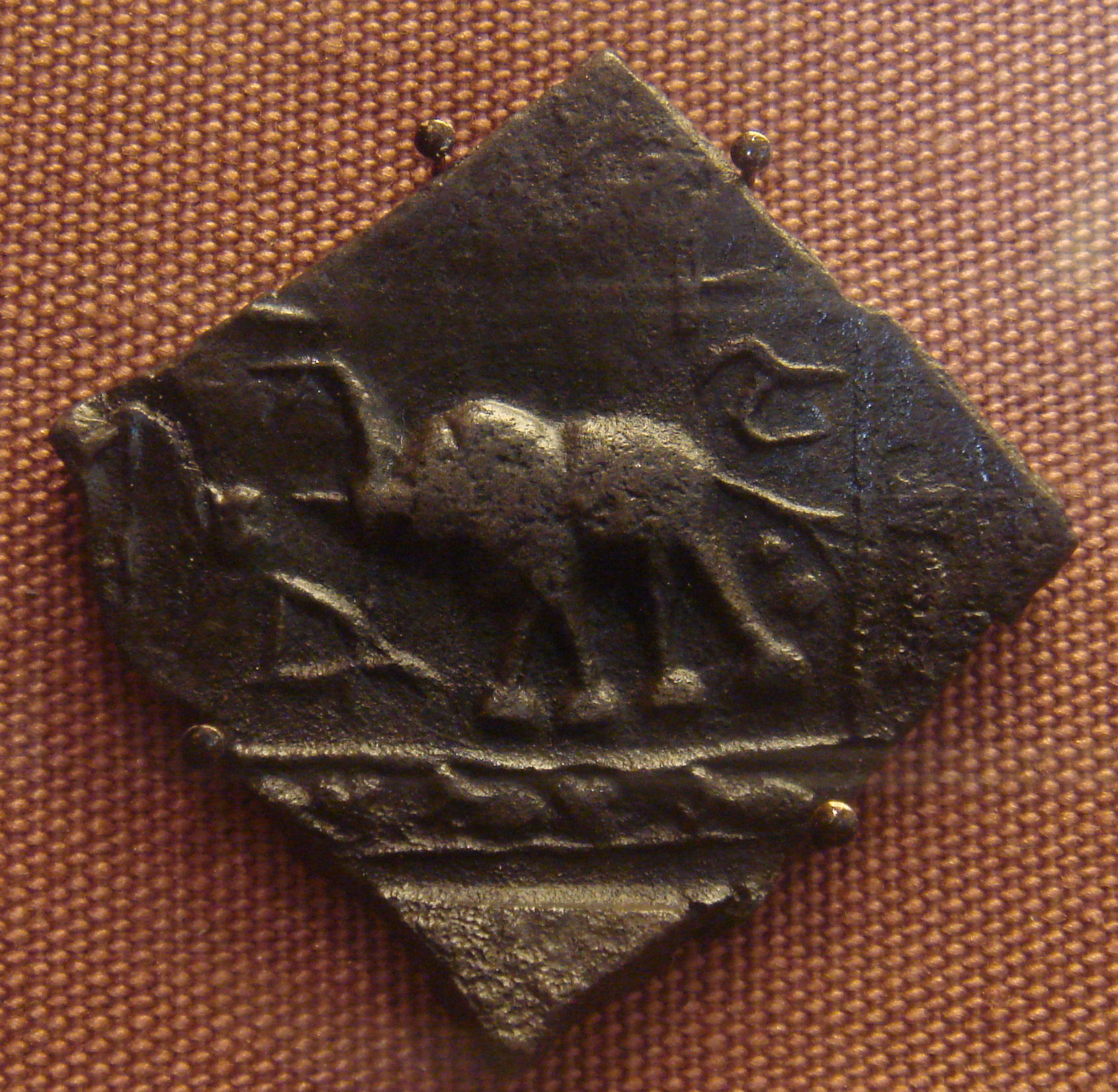
Satavahana 1st century BCE coin inscribed in Brahmi: "(Sataka)Nisa". British Museum

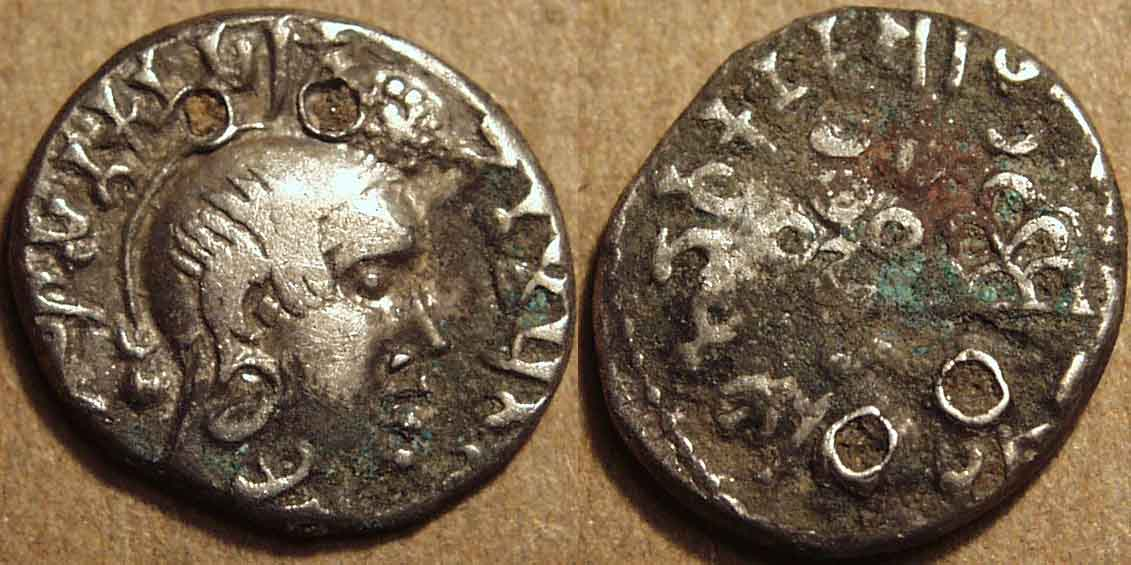
Coin of Gautamiputra Yajna Satakarni (r. 167 – 196 CE).

== Cultural achievements ==
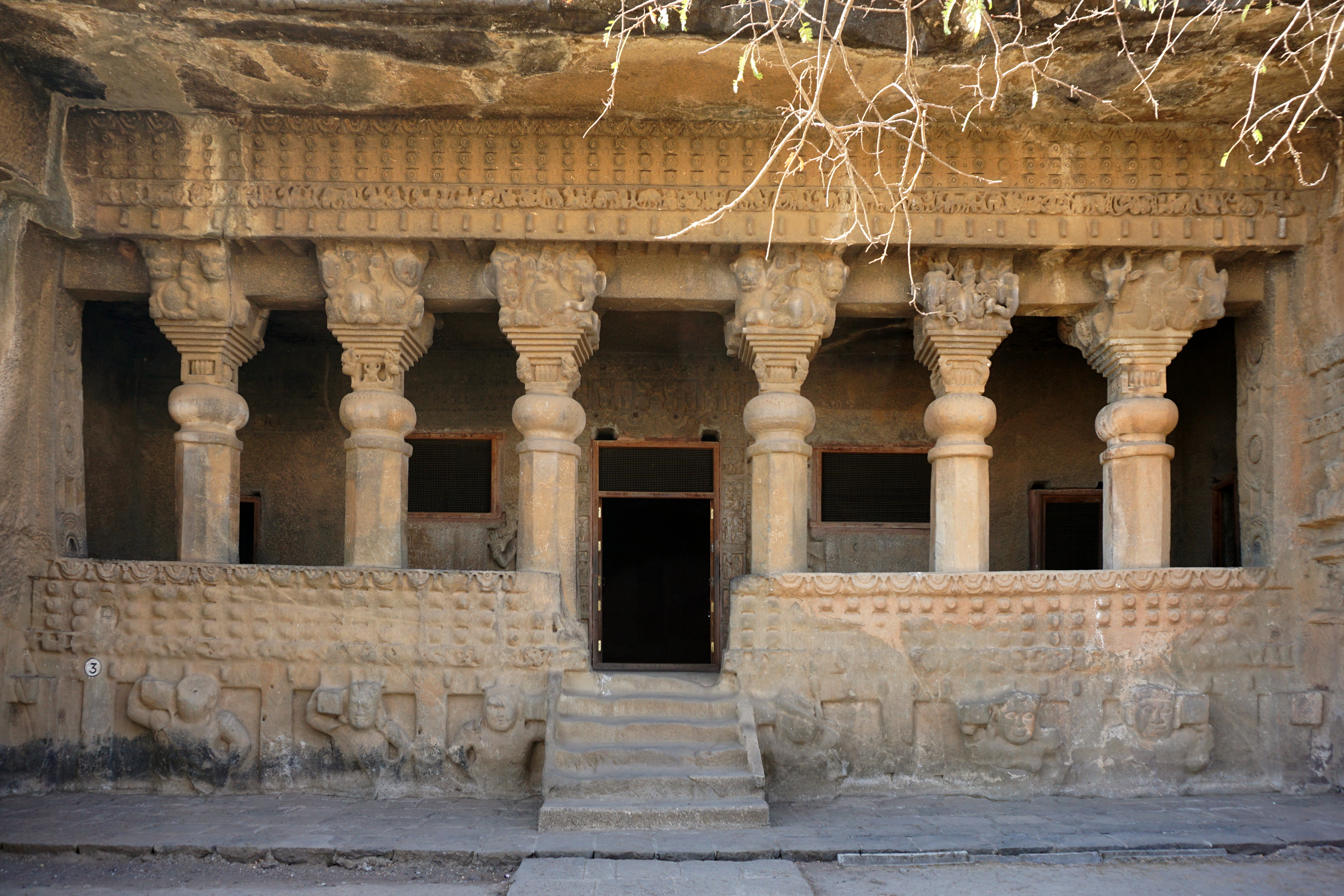
Satavahana architecture at Cave No.3 of the Pandavleni Caves in Nashik. This cave was probably started during the reign of Gautamiputra Satakarni, and was finished and dedicated to the Buddhist Samgha during the reign of his son Vasishthiputra Pulumavi, circa 150 CE.

The Satavahanas patronised the Prakrit language instead of Sanskrit. The Satavahana king Hāla is famous for compiling the collection of Maharashtri poems known as the Gaha Sattasai (Sanskrit: Gāthā Saptashatī), although from linguistic evidence it seems that the work now extant must have been re-edited in the succeeding century or two. Through this book, it was evident that agriculture was the main means of livelihood. Also many sorts of superstitions had prevailed. Additionally, Gunadhya, the minister of Hala, was the author of Brihatkatha.

=== Sculptures ===
Madhukar Keshav Dhavalikar writes that "The Satavahana sculptures unfortunately has never been recognized as an independent school in spite of the fact it has its own distinctive characteristic features. The earliest in point of time is that in the Bhaja Vihara cave which marks the beginning of sculptural art in the Satavahana dominion around 200BC. It is profusely decorated with carvings, and even pillars have a lotus capital crowned with sphinx-like mythic animals." Dhavalikar also writes that in Chankama "the panel occurring on the west pillar of Northern Gateway portrays a very important event in Buddha's life. It depicts votaries, two each on either side of what looks like a ladder which actually is the promenade which Buddha is supposed to have walked. It is said that Buddha, after attaining Enlightment, spent four weeks near the Bodhi tree. Of these, the third week he spent walking along the promenade (chankama) to and fro."

Along with some of the above major Satavahana sculptures some more sculptures existed—namely, Dvarapala, Gajalaksmi, Shalabhanjikas, Royal Procession, Decorative pillar, etc.

=== Bronze ===
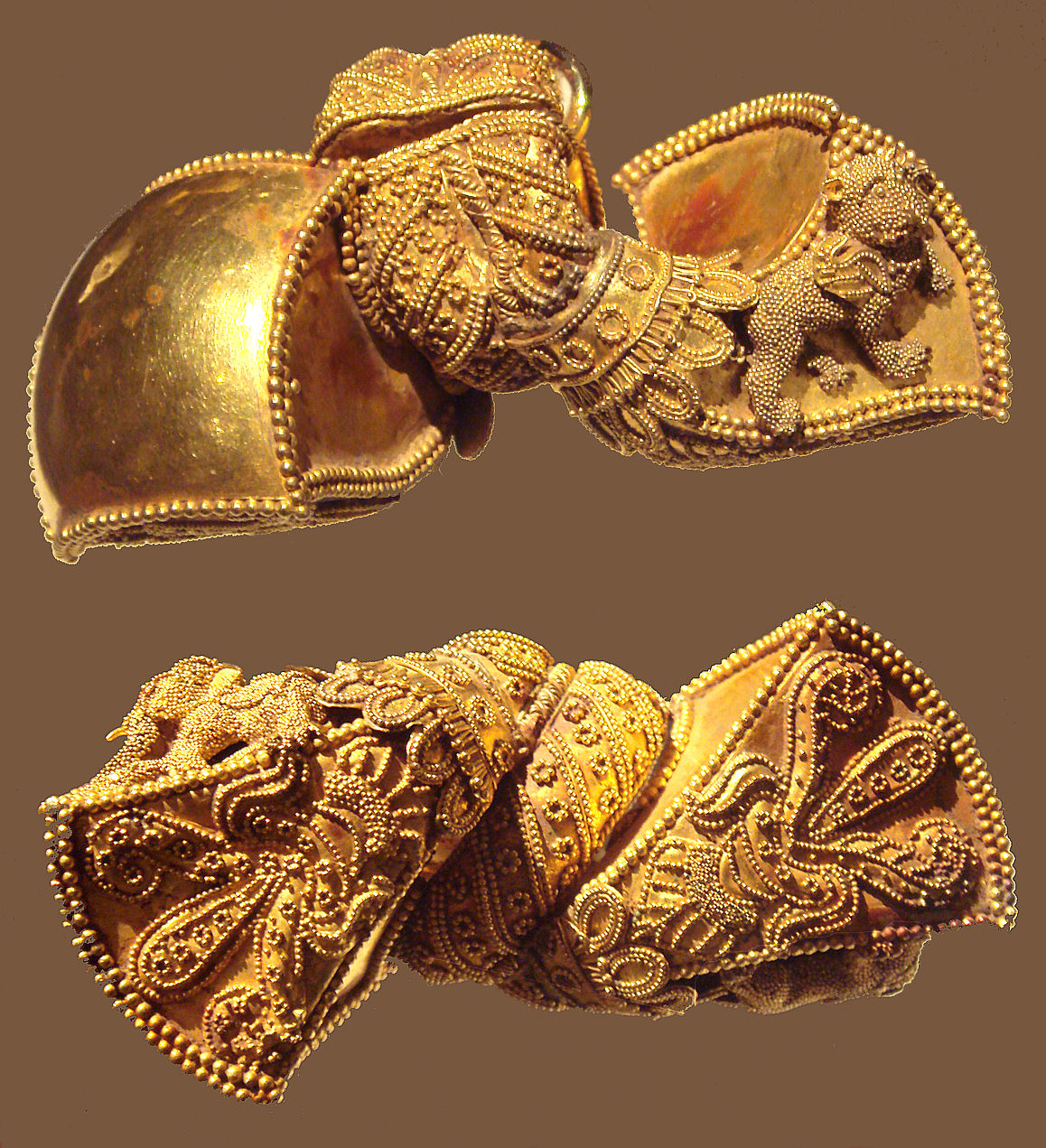
Royal earrings, Andhra Pradesh, 1st century BCE.

Several metal figurines are found that could be attributed to the Satavahanas. A hoard of unique bronze objects were also found from Bramhapuri. Numerous articles obtained from there were Indian but also reflected Roman and Italian influence. A small statue of Poseidon, wine jugs, and a plaque depicting Perseus and Andromeda were also obtained from the house from where the objects were found. The fine elephant in the Ashmolean Museum, the Yaksi image in the British Museum, and the cornucopia found in Posheri, kept at Chhatrapati Shivaji Maharaj Vastu Sangrahalaya can also be attributed to the Satavahana period.

=== Architecture ===
The sculptures of the Amaravati Stupa and the wider Amaravati style represent the architectural development of the Satavahana periods. They built Buddhist stupas in Amravati (95 feet high). They also constructed a large number of stupas at Goli, Jaggiahpeta, Ghantasala, Amaravati Bhattiprolu, and Shri Parvatam. Caves IX and X, containing Ajanta paintings, were patronised by Satavahana, and the painting throughout the caves appear to have started with them. Ashokan Stupas were enlarged, the earlier bricks and wood works being replaced with stone works. The most famous of these monuments are the stupas, the most famous among them being the Amravati Stupa and the Nagarjunakonda Stupa.

=== Paintings ===
The Satavahana paintings are the earliest surviving specimens—excluding prehistoric rock art—in India, and they are to be found only at the Ajanta Caves. There were two phases of artistic activity of Ajanta: the first occurring in the 2nd to 1st centuries BCE, when Hinayana caves were excavated during Satavahana rule; the later in the second half of the 5th century under the Vakatakas. Vagaries of nature and some vandalism have taken a heavy toll on the Ajanta Caves. Only a few fragments related to the Satavahanas have survived in Caves No. 9 and 10, both of which are chaitya-grihas with stupas.

The most important surviving painting of the Satavahana period at Ajanta is the Chhadanta Jataka in Cave No. 10, but that, too, is only fragmentary. It is a painting of an elephant named Bodhisattva with six tusks, related to a mythological story. The human figures, both male and female, are typically Satavahanas, almost identical with their counterparts on the Sanchi Gateways so far as their physiognomy, costumes, and jewellery are concerned. The only difference is that the Sanchi figures have shed some of their weight.

=== Art of Amaravati ===
The Satavahana rulers are also remarkable for their contributions to Buddhist art and architecture. They built great stupas in the Krishna River Valley, including the stupa at Amaravati in Andhra Pradesh. The stupas were decorated in marble slabs and sculpted with subjects including scenes from the life of the Buddha, portrayed in a characteristic slim and elegant style. The regional Amaravati style of sculpture also influenced the sculpture of Southeast Asia.

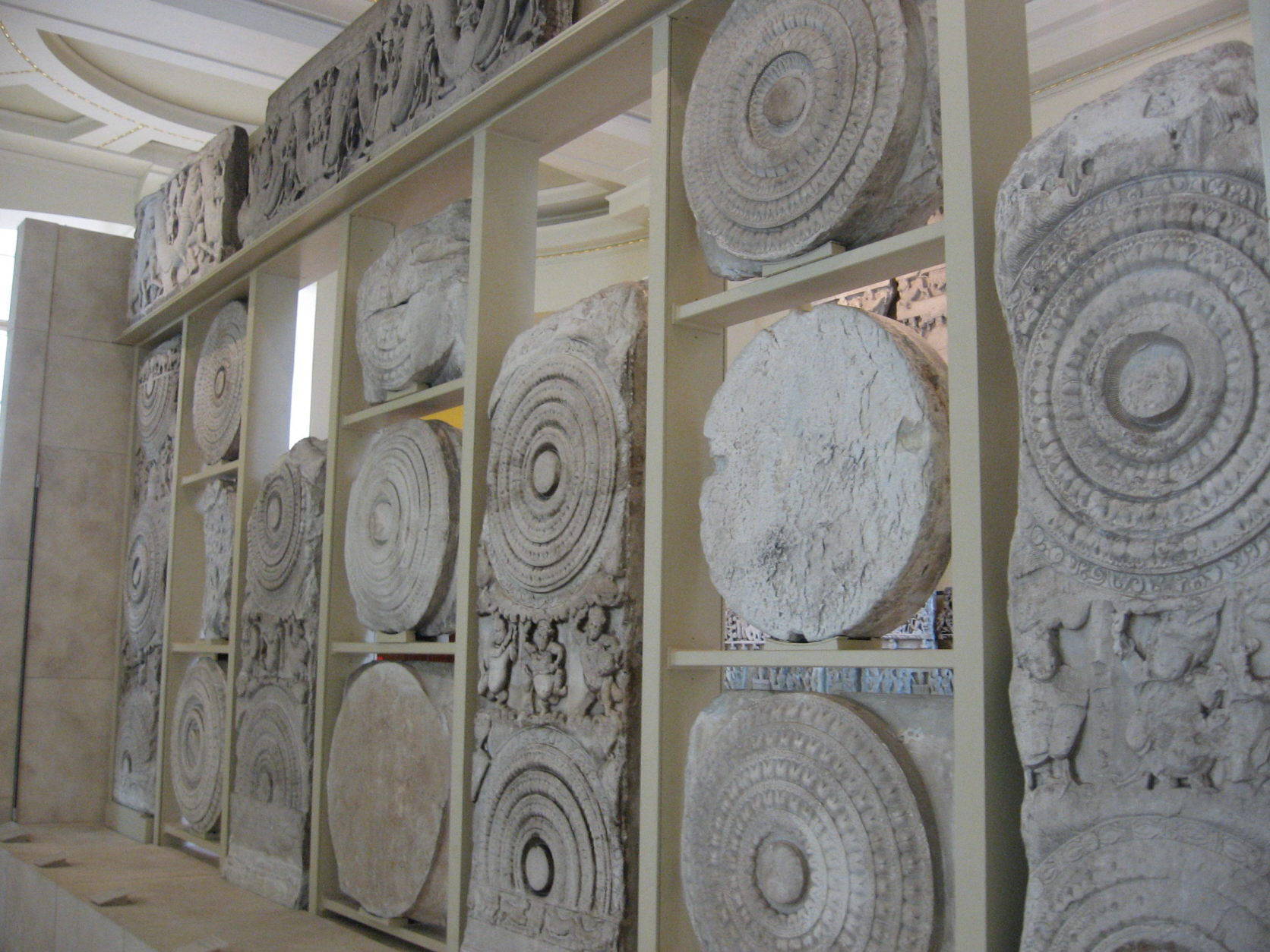
Amaravati Marbles, fragments of Buddhist stupa

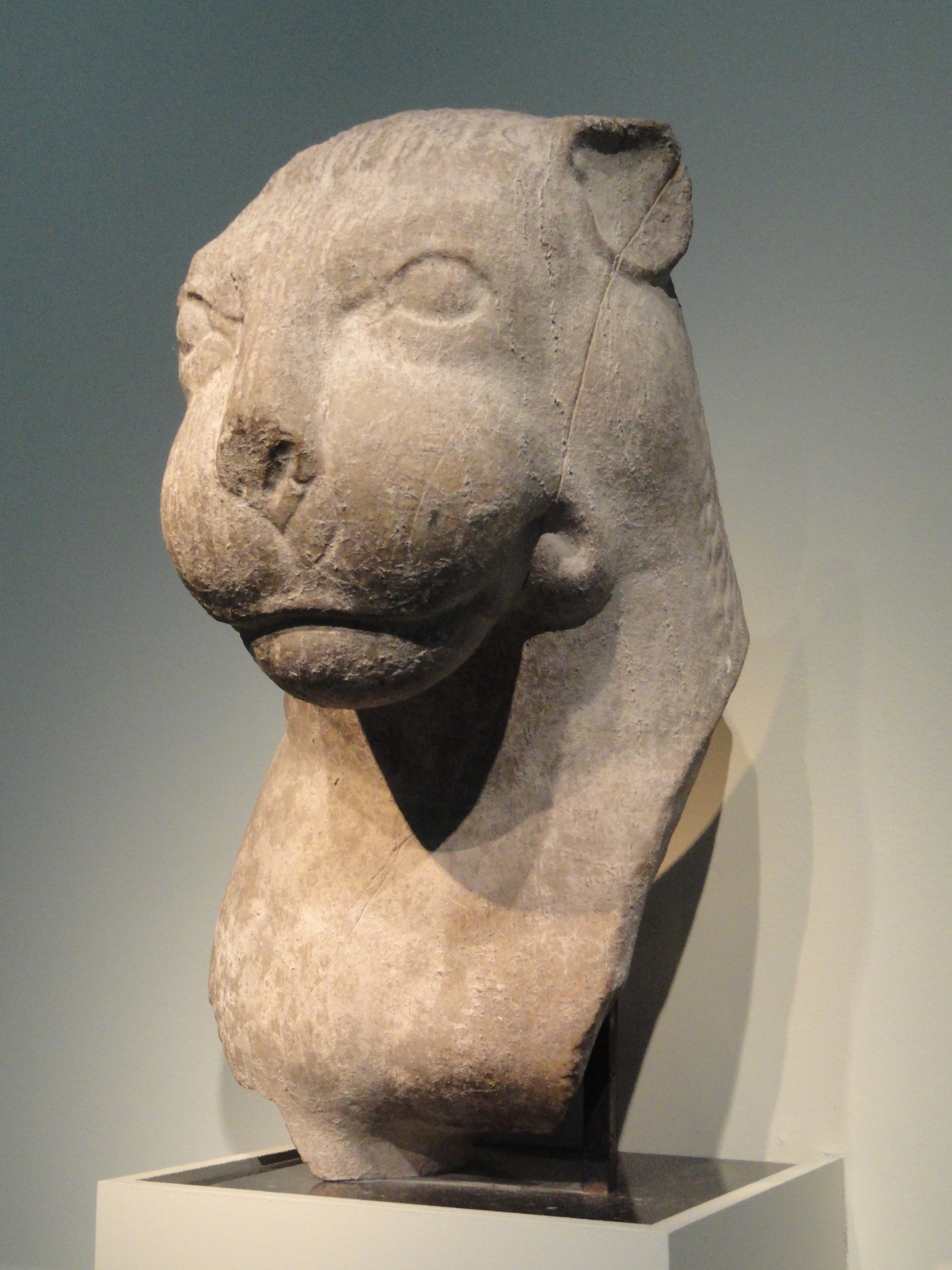
Fragment of Amaravati stupa

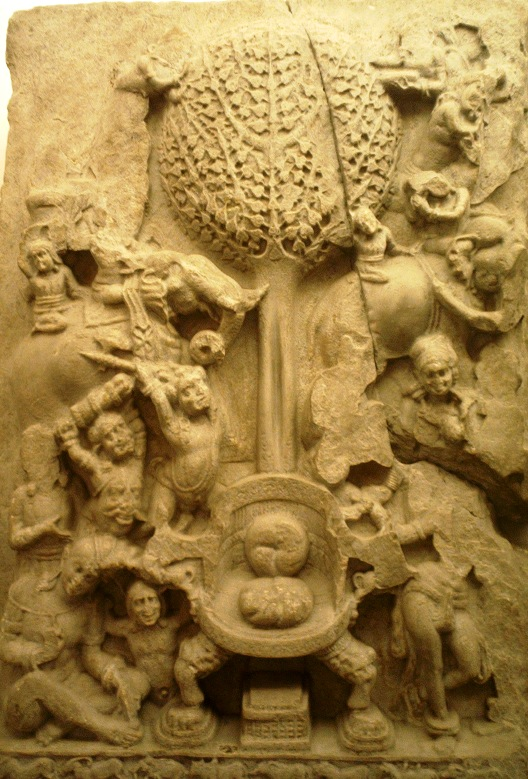
Mara's assault on the Buddha, 2nd century, Amaravati style

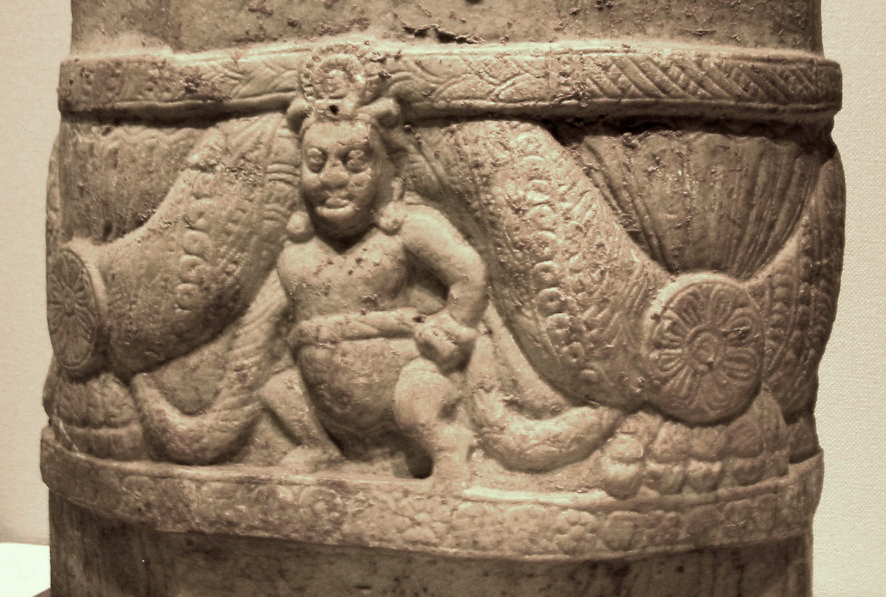
Scroll supported by Indian Yaksha, Amaravati Stupa, 2nd–3rd century CE.

== See also ==
- History of Andhra Pradesh
- History of Telangana
- History of Maharashtra
- History of India
- History of Hinduism
- List of Indian monarchs
- List of wars involving India

Timeline and cultural period	Indus plain (Punjab-Sapta Sindhu-Gujarat)	Gangetic Plain			Central India	Southern India
Timeline and cultural period	Indus plain (Punjab-Sapta Sindhu-Gujarat)	Upper Gangetic Plain (Ganga-Yamuna doab)	Middle Gangetic Plain	Lower Gangetic Plain	Central India	Southern India
IRON AGE
Culture	Late Vedic Period	Late Vedic Period; Painted Grey Ware culture	Late Vedic Period; Northern Black Polished Ware		Pre-history	
6th century BCE	Gandhara	Kuru-Panchala	Magadha		Adivasi (tribes)	Assaka
Culture	Persian-Greek influences	"Second Urbanisation"; Rise of Shramana movements Jainism - Buddhism - Ājīvika - Yoga			Pre-history	
5th century BCE	(Persian conquests)		Shaishunaga dynasty		Adivasi (tribes)	Assaka
4th century BCE	(Greek conquests)	Nanda empire				
HISTORICAL AGE
Culture	Spread of Buddhism				Pre-history	
3rd century BCE	Maurya Empire					Satavahana dynasty Sangam period (300 BCE – 200 CE); Early Cholas; Early Pandyan kingdom Cheras
Culture	Preclassical Hinduism (Note: Michaels (2004) p.39) - "Hindu Synthesis" (Note: Hiltebeitel (2002)) (ca. 200 BCE - 300 CE) (Note: Michaels (2004) p.39) (Note: Hiltebeitel (2002)); Epics - Puranas - Ramayana - Mahabharata - Bhagavad Gita - Brahma Sutras - Smarta Tradition; Mahayana Buddhism					
2nd century BCE	Indo-Greek Kingdom		Shunga Empire; Maha-Meghavahana Dynasty			Satavahana dynasty Sangam period (300 BCE – 200 CE); Early Cholas; Early Pandyan kingdom Cheras
1st century BCE	Indo-Greek Kingdom		Shunga Empire; Maha-Meghavahana Dynasty			Satavahana dynasty Sangam period (300 BCE – 200 CE); Early Cholas; Early Pandyan kingdom Cheras
1st century CE	Indo-Scythians; Indo-Parthians		Kuninda Kingdom			Satavahana dynasty Sangam period (300 BCE – 200 CE); Early Cholas; Early Pandyan kingdom Cheras
2nd century	Kushan Empire					Satavahana dynasty Sangam period (300 BCE – 200 CE); Early Cholas; Early Pandyan kingdom Cheras
3rd century	Kushano-Sasanian Kingdom; Western Satraps	Kushan Empire		Kamarupa kingdom	Adivasi (tribes)	Satavahana dynasty Sangam period (300 BCE – 200 CE); Early Cholas; Early Pandyan kingdom Cheras
Culture	"Golden Age of Hinduism"(ca. CE 320-650) (Note: Michaels (2004) p.40); Puranas - Kural; Co-existence of Hinduism and Buddhism					
4th century	Kidarites	Gupta Empire; Varman dynasty				Andhra Ikshvakus; Kalabhra dynasty Kadamba Dynasty; Western Ganga Dynasty
5th century	Hephthalite Empire	Alchon Huns				Vishnukundina; Kalabhra dynasty
6th century	Nezak Huns; Kabul Shahi; Maitraka				Adivasi (tribes)	Vishnukundina; Badami Chalukyas; Kalabhra dynasty
Culture	Late-Classical Hinduism (ca. CE 650-1100) (Note: Michaels (2004) p.41); Advaita Vedanta - Tantra; Decline of Buddhism in India					
7th century	Indo-Sassanids		Vakataka dynasty Empire of Harsha	Mlechchha dynasty	Adivasi (tribes)	Badami Chalukyas; Eastern Chalukyas; Pandyan kingdom (revival); Pallava
7th century	Karkota dynasty				Adivasi (tribes)	
8th century	Kabul Shahi	Pala Empire			Adivasi (tribes)	Eastern Chalukyas; Pandyan kingdom Kalachuri
9th century	Gurjara-Pratihara				Adivasi (tribes)	Rashtrakuta Empire; Eastern Chalukyas; Pandyan kingdom Medieval Cholas; Chera Perumals of Makkotai
10th century	Ghaznavids			Pala dynasty Kamboja-Pala dynasty	Adivasi (tribes)	Kalyani Chalukyas; Eastern Chalukyas; Medieval Cholas; Chera Perumals of Makkotai; Rashtrakuta
References and sources for table References Sources: Flood, Gavin D. (1996). An Introduction to Hinduism. Cambridge University Press.; Hiltebeitel, Alf (2002). Hinduism. In: Joseph Kitagawa, "The Religious Traditions of Asia: Religion, History, and Culture". Routledge.; Michaels, Axel (2004). Hinduism. Past and present. Princeton, New Jersey: Princeton University Press.
