= Alaṃkāradappaṇa =

Prakrit work of poetics

Alaṃkāradappaṇa (Māhārāṣṭri Prākrit: अलंकारदप्पणो, romanized: Alaṅkāradappaṇō, lit. 'The Mirror of Ornaments') is Prakrit work of poetics. It consists of 134 verses defining and exemplifying 42 poetic ornaments, and is the only surviving work on poetics in the Prakrit language.

== Author ==
The author of the Alaṃkāradappaṇa is unknown. C. D. Dalal proposed that the author may have been a Jain, on the basis of a reference in the work's initial benediction to suidēviaṁ, i.e., Śrutidēvī, the goddess of learning in the Jain tradition. However, the rest of the work lacks any mention of Jain figures, whereas Śiva and Viṣṇu appear in the example verses.

Harivallabh C. Bhayani suggested Svayambhū, an Apabhraṃśa poet, might have been the author, noting that his son Tribhuvana ascribed works on "grammar, meter, and poetics" to him; however, none of Svayambhū's other works are anonymous, and whereas most of Svayambhū's work defined and exemplified Apabhraṃśa verse forms, the Alaṃkāradappaṇa makes no reference to Apabhraṃśa literature.

== Content ==
Definition and example of the asamā ('incomparable') ornament

It is incomparable, they say,
when the target becomes the standard.

There is nobody in the world like you in beauty,
slender girl, you who are like none other than yourself,
you who adorn the entire world with an expanse
of loveliness pure as moonlight.

उवमेओ किर जीए उवमाणं होइ सा असमा ॥ १६ ॥

जोण्हाणिम्मललाअण्णपसरचिंचईअसअलभुअणाइ ।
तुह तुज्झ व्व किसोअरि समाणरूवा जए णत्थि ॥ १८ ॥

— Alaṅkāradappaṇō, verses 16cd and 18, translated by Andrew Ollett

The Alaṃkāradappaṇa is written in Māhārāṣṭrī Prakrit and is the only surviving work of poetics in that language. It contains 134 verses, defining and exemplifying 42 alaṅkārās ("literary ornaments"), with some alaṅkārās containing subvarities which are similarly defined and exemplified. All except two of the verses are in the gāhā metre. The examples were likely taken from now-lost Prakrit works; some of the example verses have also been found quoted in other anthologies and a Sanskrit work on poetics.

== Influence ==
The definitions of the poetic ornaments found in the Alaṃkāradappaṇa are very similar to the ones in Bhāmaha's Kāvyālaṃkāra. Andrew Ollett argues that Bhāmaha borrowed his definitions from the Alaṃkāradappaṇa; this would make it older of two and thus possibly the earliest extant alaṃkāraśāstra. In a review of Ollett's edition, Herman Tieken argued that the borrowing more plausibly runs the other way.

== Manuscript and editions ==
The work survives in a single, undated palm-leaf manuscript, no. 326 of the Jinabhadrasūri Palm-leaf Manuscript Collection, held at the Jaisalmer Fort. Agaracandra Nāhaṭā published a few verses of the text in 1964, and then the entire text in 1968 with Sanskrit and Hindi translations by his nephew, Bhaṁvaralāla Nāhaṭā. Harivallabh C. Bhayani published an edition of the text in 1999 based on Nāhaṭā's edition and a photocopy of the manuscript. In 2001, Pārśvanātha Vidyāpīṭha published another edition of the text based on Nāhaṭā's and taking into account Bhayani's edition, and included two introductions by Bhāgacandra Jaina "Bhāskara" and Surēśa Candra Pāṇḍe. Andrew Ollett published an edition of the text in 2024, based on colour photographs of the manuscript—included in the book—and the previously published editions.

- Agaracandra Nāhaṭā (1964). प्राकृत-भाषा का एक मात्र आलंकारिक ग्रन्थ: अलंकार-दर्पण. गुरुदेव श्री रत्न मुनि स्मृति-ग्रन्थ (in Hindi). Gurudēva Smr̥ti-grantha-samiti. pp. 394–398.
- Bhaṁvaralāla Nāhaṭā; Agaracandra Nāhaṭā (1968). प्राकृतभाषा का एक मात्र अलंकारशास्त्र: अलंकारदप्पण. मरुधर केसरी मुनिश्री मिश्रीमलजी महाराज अभिनन्दन ग्रन्थ (in Hindi). Marudharakēsarī-Abhinandanagrantha-Prakāśana-Samiti. pp. 430–458.
- H. C. Bhayani, ed. (1999). Alaṁkāradappaṇa. L. D. Series. Vol. 120. L. D. Institute of Indology.
- Bhaṁvaralāla Nāhaṭā; Surēśa Candra Pāṇḍe, eds. (2001). अलंकारदप्पण (in Hindi). Pārśvanātha Vidyāpīṭha.
- Andrew Ollett (2024). The Mirror of Ornaments (Alaṅkāradappaṇō): A Prakrit Work of Poetics (PDF). UniorPress. ISBN 978-88-6719-283-0.
