= Hāla =

Satavahana dynasty king from 20 to 24 CE

Satavahana Emperor
- Reign: c. 20 – c. 24 CE
- House: Satavahana

Hāla (r. 20–24 CE) was a Satavahana king who ruled in present-day Deccan region. The Matsya Purana mentions him as the 17th ruler of the Satavahana dynasty.

The Maharashtri Prakrit poem by Kouhala, Lilavai (c. 800 CE) describes his romance with a princess of Simhaladvipa (identified with present-day Sri Lanka). Vijayananda, the commander-in-chief of Hala's army led a successful campaign in Ceylon. On his way back, he stayed at Sapta Godavari Bhimam. Here, he learned of Lilavai, the beautiful daughter of the king of Ceylon. He narrated her story to Hāla. King Hāla secured Lilavai and married her.

Hāla is famous for compiling an anthology of Maharashtri Prakrit poems known as the Gaha Sattasai (Sanskrit:Gāthā Saptaśatī), although from linguistic evidence it seems that the work now extant must have been re-edited in the succeeding century or two.
