= Nairanjana =

Nairanjana may refer to the Lilajan River in India. It is also an Indian female given name. Notable people with the name include:

- Nairanjana Dasgupta, Indian statistician
- Nairanjana Ghosh, Indian journalist and television personality
