= Maharashtri Prakrit =

Prakrit language of ancient and medieval India

Maharashtri
- Mahārāṣṭri
- Brahmi: 𑀫𑀳𑀸𑀭𑀸𑀱𑁆𑀝𑁆𑀭𑀻, Modi: 𑘦𑘮𑘰𑘨𑘰𑘬𑘿𑘘𑘿𑘨𑘲
- Region: Maharashtra, India.
- Era: 500 BCE – 1000 CE; developed into Marathi and Konkani
- Language family: Indo-European: Indo-Iranian; Indo-Aryan; Maharashtri

Language codes
- ISO 639-3: pmh
- Glottolog: maha1305

Maharashtri or Maharashtri Prakrit (Mahārāṣṭrī Prākṛta) is a Prakrit language of ancient as well as medieval India.

Maharashtri Prakrit was commonly spoken until 875 CE and was the official language of the Satavahana dynasty. Works like Karpūramañjarī and Gatha Saptashati (150 BCE) were written in it. Jain Acharya Hemachandra is the grammarian of Maharashtri Prakrit. Maharashtri Prakrit was the most widely used Prakrit language in western and southern India.

== History ==
The rise of the Prakrits is dated to the middle of the first millennium BCE when they existed alongside Vedic Sanskrit and later evolved into highly developed literary languages. It is a subject of scholarly debate as to whether Sanskrit or the Prakrits are older with some scholars contending that Sanskrit was born out of the Prakrits. According to the Sanskrit scholar, Rajaramshastri Bhagawat, Maharashtri is older and more vivacious than Sanskrit.

Vararuchi, the oldest known grammarian of Prakrit, devotes four chapters of his Prakrita-Prakasha (IAST: Prákṛta-Prakāśa) to the grammar of Maharashtri Prakrit. The other popular Prakrits; Shauraseni, Magadhi, Ardhamagadhi, and Paishachi, have only one each. Poet Dandin (fl. 6th–7th century) in his Kavyadarsha grants it the highest status among all Prakrits.

== Demographics ==
Maharashtri is the most attested amongst all Prakrit languages. It was spoken from Malwa and Rajputana (north) to the Krishna River and Tungabhadra River region (south). Historians agree that Maharashtri and other Prakrit languages prevailed in what is now modern Maharashtra. Maharashtri was widely spoken in Western India and even as far south as Kannada-speaking region.

== Literature ==
"Paumachariyam", written by Vimalsuri is the earliest known Jain version of the Ramayana and the oldest work of literature written in Maharashtri Prakrit. The Gatha Saptashati is attributed to King Hāla (r. 20-24 CE). Other Maharashtri Prakrit works include the Setubandha of Pravarasena II, Karpuramañjarī and Sri Harivijay. The language was used by Vakpati to write the poem Gaudavaho. Alaṃkāradappaṇa is an extant work on poetics written in the language.

It is also used in the dialogue and songs of low-class characters in Sanskrit plays, especially the famous dramatist Kālidāsa.

== Patronage ==
Maharashtri was the official language of the Satavahana dynasty. Under the patronage of the Satavahana Empire, Maharashtri became the most widespread Prakrit of its time, and also dominated the literary culture amongst the three Dramatic Prakrits of the time, Maharashtri, Shauraseni and Magadhi. A version of Maharashtri called Jaina Maharashtri was also employed to write Jain scripture.

== See also ==
- Marathi
- Malvani Konkani
