= Gaha Sattasai =

Ancient Indian Prakrit text

The Gāhā Sattasaī or Gāhā Kośa (Sanskrit: गाथा सप्तशती, romanized: Gāthā Saptaśatī) is an ancient collection of love poems in the Maharashtri Prakrit language. They are written as frank monologues usually by a married woman, or an unmarried girl. They often express her unrequited feelings and longings to her friend, mother, or another relative, lover, husband, or to herself. Many poems are notable for describing unmarried girls daring for secret rendezvous to meet boys in ancient India, or about marital problems with husbands who remains emotionally a stranger to his wife and bosses over her, while trying to have affairs with other women.

Gaha Sattasai is one of the oldest known Subhashita-genre text. It deals with the emotions of love, and has been called the "opposite extreme" of Kamasutra. While Kamasutra is a theoretical work on love and sex, Gaha Sattasai is a practical compilation of examples describing "untidy reality of life" where seduction formulae do not work, love seems complicated and emotionally unfulfilling. It also mentioned Radha and Krishna in one of its verse as nayika and nayak respectively.

== Authorship and date ==
The collection is attributed to the king Hāla who lived in the 1st century. Inside the text, many poems include names of authors, some of which are names of kings from many South Indian particularly Deccan region kingdoms from the first half of the first millennium CE. According to Schelling, one version of the text names 278 poets.

According to Ram Karan Sharma, this text is from the 1st century CE. According to Ludwik Sternbach, the text was interpolated and revised by later scribes. It is unlikely to be the work of Hala, based on style, inconsistencies between its manuscripts and because other sources state it had as many as 389 authors. Sternbach places the text between 2nd and 4th-century CE. Khoroche and Tieken place the text between 3rd and 4th century CE, but before 640 CE because Banabhatta cites it in his preface to the 7th-century classic Harshacharita.

== Manuscripts ==
The text exists in many versions. Manuscripts have been found in many parts of India in many languages, far from Maharashtra. The existence of many major recensions, states Moriz Winternitz, suggests that the text was very popular by early medieval era in India. The poems were changed over time, sometimes deleted and replaced with different poems, though every manuscript contains exactly 700 poems consistent with the meaning of the title.

The first critical edition of the Sattasaī was by Albrecht Weber in 1881. It is based on seventeen manuscripts, and contains 964 poems in total, of which 430 are common to all manuscripts. Weber was also the first person to translate the poems into a European language (into German), but his translation was published in journals and not as a separate book. The only English translation to include 700 verses (1–700 of Weber's edition) is by Radhagovinda Basak in 1970. There is also a Sanskrit translation of the Sattasaī with commentary, made available by the Rashtriya Sanskrit Sansthan. One of the most important translation of this text along with an elaborate introduction has been done by Sadashiv Atmaram Joglekar in Marathi, published in 1956.

The text was popular across India, and attracted at least fourteen commentaries.

== Contents ==
Although the name mentions 700 single verse poems in 7 chapters, the various available manuscripts contain a variable number of total poems. S.A. Joglekar has carefully compiled them and has identified a total of 1006 poems in a book titled Halsatvahan’s Gathasaptashati Published in 1956 by Prasad Publications, Pune. It consists of 700 single-verse poems, divided into 7 chapters of 100 verses each. All the poems are couplets, and most are in the musical arya metre. Many poems of the text include names of gods and goddesses in Hinduism, for allegorical comparison of a woman's feelings.

=== Economic Life ===
The folk who composed these poems lived in rural, forested and forest fringe areas. Agriculture and hunting were their chief occupations. Around 100 poems contain references to fields, crops under cultivation, farming implements and accessories such as fencing, farming operations and storing and processing of agricultural produce. Similarly around 100 poems contain references to animals hunted, hunting implements and hunting operations.

=== Plants and animals ===
While the poems are basically love poems their natural setting includes references to a number of plant and animal species. Some plant species such as Ricinus communis and Pandanus are mentioned just once. Others, for example, mango(17) and lotus (49) are mentioned in several poems. Altogether 170 poems mention plant species. Some animal species such as leopard, cat and honeybee are mentioned just once. Others, for example, cattle (16), elephant (20) and bumblebee (30) are mentioned in several poems. Altogether 163 poems mention animal species. Mango, cattle and elephant are important in day- to-day life, while lotus is attractive and bumblebees being trapped in the lotus flowers at night is a popular poetic convention. Thus, 333 out of 1006 poems refer to some plant or animal species. This reflects the fact that the common people composing these poems lived in close vicinity of nature.

== Samples ==
Mother
with the blink of an eye
his love vanished
A trinket gets
dangled
into your world
you reach out and it's gone

— Hala, tr. Schelling

Lone buck
in the clearing
Nearby doe
eyes him with such
longing
that there
in the trees the hunter
seeing his own girl
lets the bow drop

— Anonymous, tr. Schelling

I have heard so much about you from others
And now at last I see you with my own eyes.
Please, my dear, say something
So that my ears, too, may drink nectar.

— Unknown, tr. Peter Khoroche and Herman Tieken

My braided hair's not straight yet, And you again speak of leaving.

— Gatha 273

If one of two beings
who grew up together in joy and pain
and loved each other for a long time,
dies –
this one lives,
and the other one is dead.

— Poem 142, tr. Ludwik Sternbach

Cow elephants once turned widows
When my son launched a single arrow
But his wife has now so weakened him
That he uselessly bears a burden
Of arrows on his own back

— Poem 630, from Joglekar's compilation

== Bibliography ==
- Peter Khoroche; Herman Tieken (2009). Poems on life and love in ancient India: Hāla's Sattasaī. Excelsior Editions. ISBN 978-0-7914-9392-2.
- Schelling, Andrew (2008). Dropping the Bow: Poems of Ancient India (2 ed.). Companions for the Journey Series: 15. Review
- Moriz Winternitz (1985). Subhadra Jha (transl.) (ed.). History of Indian literature. Motilal Banarsidass. pp. 108–116. ISBN 978-81-208-0056-4.
- T. R. S. Sharma; C. K. Seshadri; June Gaur (2000). Ancient Indian literature: an anthology, Volume 1 (reprint ed.). Sahitya Akademi. p. 689. ISBN 978-81-260-0794-3.
- Albrecht Weber, ed. (1881). Das Saptaçatakam des Hâla. in Commission bei F.A.Brockhaus.
- Joglekar, Sadashiv Atmaram (1956). Hal Satvahanachi Gatha Saptashati. (Marathi).
