= Huvina Hipparagi =

- Town
- Location in Karnataka, India Huvina Hipparagi (India)
- Coordinates: 16.59°N 75.96°E
- Country: India
- State: Karnataka
- District: Bijapur
- Talukas: Basavan Bagewadi

Population (2010)
  - Total: 12,000
  - Density: 250/km^{2} (650/sq mi)

Languages
  - Official: Kannada
- Time zone: UTC+5:30 (IST)
- Postal code: 586208
- Telephone code: 08358
- Vehicle registration: KA-28
- Nearest city: Basavan Bagewadi
- Sex ratio: 55:45 ♂/♀
- Literacy: 75%
- Lok Sabha constituency: Bijapur
- Vidhan Sabha constituency: Devara Hipparagi
- Climate: Cold and Hot (Köppen)
- Website: www.huvinhipparagi.in

Huvina Hipparagi also Huvin Hipparagi is a Town in the southern state of Karnataka, India. It is located in the Basavana Bagevadi taluk of Vijayapura district in Karnataka.

== Demographics ==
As of 2001 India census, Huvinahippargi had a population of about 12000 with 7000 males and 5000 females.

== Temples ==
Shree Guru Paramanad Temple, Shree Hanuman Temple, Shree kalikadevi Temples, Shree Lakkamma Devi Temple, Mallikarjuna Swamy Temple, Kalmeshwara Temple and Mouneshwar Temple, Patri Mata.

== Mosques ==
One Darga and maszid also is there for Muslim community. In every year there is a Moharam and Uras Of Dargah Syed Shah Noorullah Quadri Baghdadi in Agasbal and various festivals are celebrated by both Hindu and Muslim religion.

== Agriculture ==
Total land of village having more than 80% of well fertile and cropping area. The village mainly grows banana, grape, maize, sorghum, and small area of lemon, onion, turmeric, and Pomegranate. Irrigation is mainly based upon borewells and wells

== Transportation ==
Huvina Hipparagi is connected to main town Bijapur via Muddebihal and Talikot. Its having many buses daily from Bijapur to Muddebihal and Talikot and vice versa.

It is major market hub for near by villages. The location of Huvina Hipparagi is very strategic & accessible by road. It is major junction to reach or divert the routes to Bijapur, Gulbarga, Talikot, Muddebihal, Basavan Bagewadi, Sindagi and Indi.

== Education ==
Educational Institution

- Jss public School
- Govt Higher Primary School for Boys
- Govt Higher Primary School for Girls
- Govt Higher Primary School for Boys (Orphanage)
- Paramanand Higher Primary school Huvin Hipparagi
- Vishwa Chetan Kendra (V.C.K.) High School
- Shri M.G.Kori and Dr.B.G.Byakod P U College (Arts, Commerce & Education PU college with High School and Primary School Section)
- Ashirwad English medium primary school
- Shri Guru Paramanand Arts College
- Shri Guru Paramanand Fine Arts College
- Shri Guru Paramanand ITI College
- M.K iti college
- National ITI College
- Shri Sharada ITI College

Computer Education

- Param Institute of Computer Technology

== Trusts ==
In village there are some associations doing cultural, sports programmes etc.

== Festivals ==
The villagers are mainly celebrated Shri Paramanand Festival, Kara Hunnume, Nagara Panchami, Deepavli, Ugadi, Dassara in every year. And Urs Of Mahboob Subhani Syed Shah Noorullah Quadri Agasbal Is Celebrated By Both Muslims and Hindus

== See also ==
- Bijapur district
- Districts of Karnataka
