= Nairanjana Ghosh =

Indian journalist

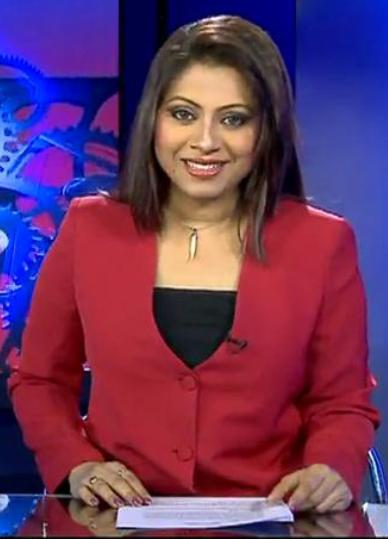
- Nairanjana at News Time
- Born: Kolkata, West Bengal, India
- Education: St. Xavier's College, Kolkata
- Occupation: Journalist
- Title: Journalist, News Anchor

Nairanjana Ghosh is an Indian journalist. Having started her career in 2004, she has worked with Star Ananda (now ABP Ananda), Kolkata TV and News Time. As a prime time news anchor she has hosted debates and discussions on a variety of news stories and reported extensively on a wide range of key political, economic, and social stories from the Indian subcontinent. She was adjudged the best News Anchor at the Tele Cine Awards, Kolkata, India, in 2007.

Nairanjana was born and brought up in Kolkata. Nairanjana did her schooling at Loreto Schools, Kolkata, and Modern High School for Girls, Kolkata. She graduated from St. Xavier’s College, Kolkata, with a degree in English literature. She received a master's degree in journalism and mass communication from Calcutta University and a postgraduate diploma in mass communication from Jadavpur University.
