= List of Satavahana kings =

The Satavahanas were the rulers of the ancient Indian Satavahana Empire.

They ruled over regions of Deccan (core region), central and southern India between c. mid 3rd century BCE to mid 3rd century CE. Gautamiputra Satakarni (r. c. 106–130 CE) is considered the greatest ruler of the Satavahana dynasty. He is known as the "Lord of the West". His mother's Nashik Prashasti inscription praises him for his military victories. The Satavahanas were the followers of Hindu religion.

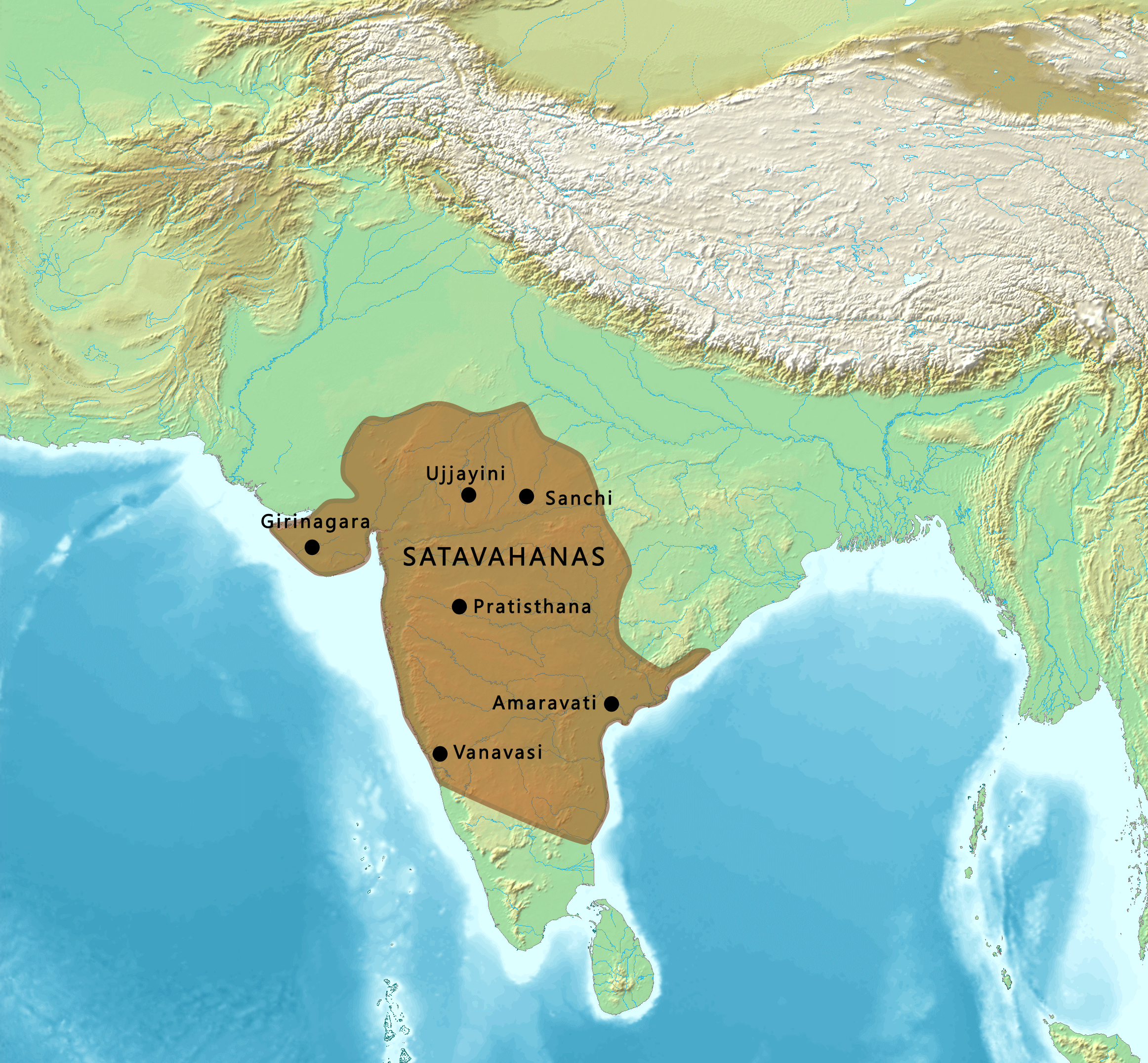
Approximate extent of the Satavahana Empire, in the early 1st century CE

The Satavahana Empire declined for a number of reasons, after Yajnashri Satakarni, the last powerful ruler, the Satavahanas were succeeded by weak rulers who were unable to manage the vast empire. The loss of centralized power led to the rise of feudatories, finally it led to the division of the empire. The Satavahanas' greatest competitors were the Sakas, who had established power in Western India.

== List of rulers ==
Multiple Puranas contain chronology of Satavahana kings. However, there are inconsistencies among the various Puranas over the number of kings in the dynasty, the names of the kings, and the length of their rule. In addition, some of the kings listed in the Puranas are not attested via archaeological and numismatic evidence. Similarly, there are some kings known from coins and inscriptions, whose names are not found in the Puranic lists.

The reconstructions of the Satavahana kings by historians fall into two categories:

- According to the first one, 30 Satavahana kings ruled for around 450 years, starting from Simuka's rule immediately after the fall of the Mauryan empire. This view relies heavily on the Puranas, and is now largely discredited.
- According to the second (and more widely accepted) category of reconstructions, the Satavahana rule started in around first century BCE. The chronologies in this category contain a smaller number of kings, and combine Puranic records with archaeological, numismatic and textual evidence.

Because of uncertainty regarding the establishment date of the Satavahana kingdom, it is difficult to give absolute dates for the reigns of the Satavahana kings. Therefore, many modern scholars do not assign absolute dates to the reigns of the historically attested Satavahana kings, and those who do vary greatly with each other.

=== List based on Archeology ===
Himanshu Prabha Ray provides the following chronology, based on archaeological and numismatic evidence:

List of Satavahana dynasty rulers
Serial. Nu	Ruler	Reign
1	Simuka	before 100 BCE
2	Kanha	c. 100–70 BCE
3	Satakarni I	c. 70–60 BCE
4	Satakarni II	c. 50–25 BCE
Kshatrapa interregnum rule with vassal Satavahana kings
5	Hāla (vassal under Kshatrapas)	c. 20–24 CE
6	Nahapana (Kshatrapas King)	c. 54–100 CE
Restored Satavahana dynasty
7	Gautamiputra Satakarni	c. 86–110 CE
8	Pulumavi	c. 110–138 CE
9	Vashishtiputra Satakarni	c. 138–145 CE
10	Shiva Shri Pulumavi	c. 145–152 CE
11	Shiva Skanda Satakarni	c. 145–152 CE
12	Yajna Shri Satakarni	c. 152–181 CE
13	Vijaya Satakarni	until c. 200 CE
Regional Satavahana rulers of south-eastern Deccan:
14	Chandra Shri	3rd century CE
15	Pulumavi II	3rd century CE
16	Abhira Isvarasena	3rd century CE
17	Madhariputra Sakasena	3rd century CE
18	Haritiputra Satakarni	3rd century CE

=== List based on Puranas ===
The various Puranas give different lists of the Satavahana rulers. The Matsya Purana states that 30 Satavahana kings ruled for 460 years, but some of its manuscripts name only 19 kings whose reigns add up to 448.5 years. The Vayu Purana also mentions that there were 30 Satavahana kings, but its various manuscripts name only 17, 18, and 19 kings respectively; the reigns add up to 272.5, 300, and 411 years respectively. Many of these kings are not attested by historical evidence. On the other hand, some Satavahana kings attested by numismatic evidence (such as Rudra Satakarni) are not mentioned in the Puranas at all.

Different scholars have explained these anomalies in different ways. Scholars such as R. G. Bhandarkar, D. C. Sircar and H. C. Raychaudhuri theorised that the Vayu Purana mentions only the main imperial branch of the dynasty, while the Matsya Purana puts together princes of all its branches.

The names of the Satavahana kings (in IAST), as mentioned in the various Puranas, are given below. These names vary across different manuscripts of the same Puranas, and some names are missing in some of the manuscripts. The list given below for each Purana contains the most exhaustive version. In the Puranas, Krishna (IAST: Kṛṣṇa) is described as brother of the first king, who overthrew the Kanva king Susharman.

Puranic genealogy of Satavahana dynasty
#	Ruler	Coins	Epigraphy	Bhagavata	Brahmanda	Matsya	Vayu	Vishnu	Reign (years)	Alternative names and reigns
1	Simuka	✓	✓	✓	✓	✓	✓	✓	23	Śiśuka (Matsya), Sindhuka (Vayu), Śipraka (Vishnu), Chhismaka (Brahmanda)
2	Kṛṣṇa (Kanha)	✓	✓	✓	✓	✓	✓	✓	18	
3	Śatakarṇi I	✓	✓	✓	✓	✓	✓	✓	10	Śantakarṇa (Bhagavata), Mallakarni - 10 or 18 years (Matsya), Śri Śatakarṇi (Vishnu)
4	Pūrṇotsanga			✓	✓	✓		✓	18	Paurṇamāsa (Bhagavata)
5	Skandastambhi				✓	✓			18	Śrivasvani (Matsya)
6	Śatakarṇi II	✓	✓	✓	✓	✓	✓	✓	56	
7	Lambodara			✓	✓	✓		✓	18	
8	Āpīlaka	✓		✓	✓	✓	✓	✓	12	Apītaka (Matsya), Ivīlaka (Vishnu), Hivilaka (Bhagavata)
9	Meghasvāti	✓		✓	✓	✓		✓	18	Saudāsa (Brahmanda)
10	Svāti (Śatakarṇi)			✓	✓	✓		✓	12	
11	Skandasvāti				✓	✓			7	Skandasvati - 28 years (Brahmanda)
12	Mṛgendra-Svātikarṇa				✓	✓			3	Mahendra Śatakarṇi (Brahmanda)
13	Kuntala-Svātikarṇa				✓	✓			8	
14	Svātikarṇa				✓	✓			1	
15	Pulomavi I	✓		✓		✓	✓	✓	24	Pulomavi - 36 years (Matsya), Aṭamāna (Bhagavata), Paṭimavi (Vayu), Paṭumat (Vishnu), Ābhi - Brahmanda
16	Gaurakṛṣṇa			✓		✓	✓	✓	25	Gorakśāśvaśri (Matsya), Nemi Kṛṣṇa (Vayu), Arishṭakarman (Vishnu)
17	Hāla			✓		✓	✓	✓	5	Hāleya (Bhagavata); 1 year in one manuscript
18	Mandalaka			✓	✓	✓	✓	✓	5	Talaka (Bhagavata), Saptaka (Vayu), Pattalaka (Vishnu), Bhavaka (Brahmanda)
19	Purindrasena			✓	✓	✓	✓	✓	5	Purīṣabhiru (Bhagavata), Purikaṣena - 21 years (Vayu), Pravillasena (Vishnu), Pravillasena - 12 years (Brahmanda)
20	Sundara Śatakarṇi			✓	✓	✓	✓	✓	1	Sundara Svatikarṇa (Matsya), Sunandana (Bhagavata)
21	Cakora Śatakarṇi (Chakora)			✓	✓	✓	✓	✓	0.5	
22	Śivasvāti			✓	✓	✓	✓	✓	28	Svātisena - 1 year (Brahmanda), Śivasvāmi (Vayu)
23	Gautamīputra	✓	✓	✓	✓	✓	✓	✓	21	Yantramati - 34 years (Brahmanda), Gotamīputra (Bhagavata and Vishnu); 24 years according to inscriptions
24	Pulomavi II (Vashishtiputra)	✓	✓	✓		✓		✓	28	Purīmān (Bhagavata), Pulomat (Matsya), Pulimat (Vishnu). See also: Vashishtiputra Satakarni.
25	Śivaśri	✓	✓	✓	✓	✓		✓	7	Madaśirā (Bhagavata)
26	Śivaskanda Śatakarṇi	✓	✓	✓	✓	✓		✓	7	
27	Yajñaśri	✓	✓	✓	✓	✓	✓	✓	29	Yajñaśri Śatakarṇi - 19 years (Brahmanda), Yajñaśri - 9, 20 or 29 years (Matsya)
28	Vijaya	✓	✓	✓		✓	✓	✓	6	
29	Candraśri (Chandrashri)	✓	✓	✓	✓	✓	✓	✓	3	Candravijaya (Bhagavata), Daṇḍaśri (Brahmanda and Vayu), Vada-Śri or Candra-Śri-Śatakarṇi - 10 years (Matsya)
30	Pulomavi III	✓	✓	✓	✓	✓	✓	✓	7	Sulomadhi (Bhagavata), Pulomavit (Matsya), Pulomarchis (Vishnu)

==== List of rulers ====
S. Nagaraju relies on the Puranic lists of 30 kings, and gives the following regnal dates:

List of Satavahana dynasty rulers
S. No	Ruler	Reign
1	Simuka	(r. 228 – 205 BCE)
2	Krishna	(r. 205 – 187 BCE)
3	Satakarni I	(r. 187 – 177 BCE)
4	Purnotsanga	(r. 177 – 159 BCE)
5	Skandhastambhi	(r. 159 – 141 BCE)
6	Satakarni II	(r. 141 – 85 BCE)
7	Lambodara	(r. 85 – 67 BCE)
8	Apilaka	(r. 67 – 55 BCE)
9	Meghasvati	(r. 55 – 37 BCE)
10	Svati	(r. 37 – 19 BCE)
11	Skandasvati	(r. 19 – 12 BCE)
12	Mrigendra Satakarni	(r. 12 – 9 BCE)
13	Kunatala Satakarni	(r. 9 – 1 BCE)
14	Satakarni III	(r. 1 BCE – 1 CE)
15	Pulumavi I	(r. 1 – 36 CE)
16	Gaura Krishna	(r. 36 – 61 CE)
17	Hāla	(r. 61 – 66 CE)
18	Mandalaka aka Puttalaka or Pulumavi II	(r. 69 – 71 CE)
19	Purindrasena	(r. 71 – 76 CE)
20	Sundara Satakarni	(r. 76 – 77 CE)
21	Chakora Satakarni	(r. 77 – 78 CE)
22	Shivasvati	(r. 78 – 106 CE)
23	Gautamiputra Satkarni	(r. 106 – 130 CE)
24	Vasisthiputra aka Pulumavi III	(r. 130 – 158 CE)
25	Shiva Sri Satakarni	(r. 158 – 165 CE)
26	Shivaskanda Satakarni	(r. 165–172)
27	Sri Yajna Satakarni	(r. 172 – 201 CE)
28	Vijaya Satakarni	(r. 201 – 207 CE)
29	Chandra Sri Satakarni	(r. 207 – 214 CE)
30	Pulumavi IV	(r. 217 – 224 CE)

=== Mid-Chronology of Satavahana rulers ===
Apart from the two traditional views (long and short chronologies) there is another kind of analysis pointing out to a "Mid-Chronology", as it was already proposed by Dr. Dehejia and others, and particularly most recently by Shailendra Bhandare, who regards Satavahana's rule extended more than three centuries (c. 150 BCE to 250 CE) with the flourish of trans-national trade, urbanism and monumental architecture in South India.

Bhandare regards Simuka to have ruled since around 160–150 BCE and that this date would still fit in well with Pargiter's 460 years to the Satavahanas, as it would fix the end of the dynasty around 300 CE, not too far from the mid-3rd century as consensus approximately lies. Regarding Siri Satakani and his wife Naganika, Bhandhare considers their rule to have been somewhere around 110 +/- 20 BCE.

==== List by Shailendra Bhandare ====
Bhandare also suggests the following sequence of reigns, based on his analysis of Satavahana coinage:

- Gautamiputa Satakani (ca. 60–85 CE)
- Vasithiputa Siri Pulumayi (ca. 85–125 CE)
- Vasithiputa Siri Satakani (ca. 125–152 CE)
- Vasithiputa Siva Siri Pulumayi (ca. 152–160 CE)
- Vasithiputa Siri Khada Satakani (ca. 160–165 CE)
- Vasithiputa Vijaya Satakani (ca. 165–170 CE)
- Siri Yaña Satakani (ca. 170–200 CE)
- Gotamiputa Siri Cada (ca. 200–215 CE)
- Gotamiputa Siri Vijaya Satakani (ca. 215–225 CE)

==== Shailendra Bhandare's edited list by Andrew Ollett ====
On the other hand, based to a large degree on Shailendra Bhandare's work, with slight corrections, Andrew Ollett (2017) mentions the following reigns for the whole Satavahana dynasty:

- Vasisthiputra Sri Chimuka Satavahana (ca. 120–96 BCE)
- Krsna (ca. 96–88 BCE)
- Sri Satakarni (ca. 88–42 BCE)
- Sakti
- Mantalaka
- Sundara
- Gautamiputra Siva Satakarni (?–60 CE)
- Gautamiputra Sri Satakarni (ca. 60–84 CE)
- Vasisthiputra Sri Pulumavi (ca. 84–119 CE)
- Vasisthiputra Sri Satakarni (ca. 119–148 CE)
- Vasisthiputra Sivasri Pulumavi (ca. 148–156 CE)
- Vasisthiputra Sriskanda Satakarni (ca. 156–170 CE)
- Gautamiputra Sriyajña Satakarni (ca. 171–199 CE)
- Gautamiputra Srivijaya Satakarni (ca. 200–205 CE)
- Vasisthiputra Sricanda Satakarni (ca. 206–220 CE)
- Mathariputra Sri Pulumavi (ca. 220–230 CE)

== See also ==
- Middle kingdoms of India
- History of India
- History of Maharashtra
- History of Hinduism
- List of Indian monarchs
- List of wars involving India
