= Kanhai (disambiguation) =

Kanhai is a village in Gurgaon mandal, Gurgaon District, Haryana state, India.

Kanhai may also refer to:

- Kanhai Chitrakar (died 2013), Indian painter
- Krishn Kanhai (born 1961), Indian painter
- Rohan Kanhai (born 1935), Guyanese cricketer who represented the West Indies in 79 Test matches

== See also ==
- Kanhaiya, a name of the Hindu deity Krishna
- Kanhaiya (film), 1959 Indian film
- Kanhaiyalal (disambiguation)
- Kanai (disambiguation)
