= Kanai =

Kanai may refer to:

- the Kanai, an ethnic group of Jews who settled the Kerala region in India.
- Kanai (Judaism), a zealot in the scriptures
- Kanai (surname), a Japanese surname
- Kanai Anzen, an amulet
- Nirai Kanai, an Okinawan myth
- Nirai Kanai (MAX song), song by MAX based on the Okinawan myth
- Kainai Nation
- Kanai, Nigeria
- Kurnai language
- Kanai of Kamen Rider Blade, human guise of the Giraffe Stag Undead
- Canae, an ancient city in the Arginusae

== See also ==
- Kanhai (disambiguation)
