= Kanha =

Kanha may refer to:

- Krishna, a Hindu deity
- Kanha (Satavahana dynasty), 1st century BCE Indian king
- Kanha (poet), Indian poet
- Kanhadadeva or Kanha (r. 1292–1311), a ruler of Jalore in medieval India
  - Kanhadade Prabandha, a book about the king by Padmanābha
- Kanha (film), a 2016 Indian Marathi-language action drama film
- Kanha National Park, in Madhya Pradesh, India
- "Kanha" (song), 2017 Bollywood song
- Kanha, a village in the Jintur taluka of Parbhani district in Maharashtra, India
- Kanha, a village in Madhya Pradesh, India
- Kahna, village in Kapurthala, Punjab, India
- Kahna Nau, town in Lahore, Punjab, Pakistan

== See also ==
- Krishna (disambiguation)
- Kanhaiya (disambiguation)
- Kanhaiyalal (disambiguation)
- Kanhaiya (film), 1959 Indian film
