= Nayanika =

Satavahana Ruler
- Reign: 1st century BCE
- Predecessor: Satakarni
- Successor: Satakarni II
- Issue: Satakarni II
- Dynasty: Satavahana

Nayanika or Naganika (1st century BCE) was the queen regent of the Satavahana dynasty during the minority of her son Satakarni II.

She was the first woman historically confirmed to have ruled over an Indian kingdom (although there are legendary women rulers before her).

She was married to king Satakarni. She was the mother of king Satakarni II (r. 50–25 BCE). Her son was a minor when he became king, and she ruled in his place as regent during his minority.
