= Musikas =

Historical Indian tribe

The Musikas were an Indian tribe of the lower Indus.

The Musikas are mentioned in the Hathigumpha inscription, where it is said they were attacked by the king of Kalinga Kharavela:

"And in the second year (he), disregarding Satakamini, dispatches to the western regions an army strong in cavalry, elephants, infantry (nara) and chariots (ratha) and by that army having reached the Kanha-bemna, he throws the city of the Musikas into consternation." Epigraphia Indica, Vol. XX
