= Kanhaiya =

Kanhaiya may refer to:

== People ==
- Kanhaiya Kumar, an Indian political activist (born 1987)
- Kanhaiya Misl, a sovereign state of the Sikh Confederacy
- Kanhaiya Baniya, a Nepalese politician
- Kanhaiya Wadhawan. an Indian cricketer

== Others ==
- Krishna, a major deity in Hinduism
- Kanhaiya (film), a 1959 Indian film
- Kanhaiya Geet, a traditional Indian song
- Kanhaiya Nagar metro station, a metro station in Delhi, India

== See also ==
- Kanhaiyalal (disambiguation)
- Kanha (disambiguation)
