= Shivaskanda Satakarni =

2nd century Satavahana King

Satavahana King
- Reign: 2nd century CE
- Predecessor: Vashishtiputra Satakarni
- Successor: Yajna Sri Satakarni
- Dynasty: Satavahana

Shivaskanda Satakarni was one of the last rulers of the Satavahana dynasty in India. He succeeded Vashishtiputra Satakarni in 145 CE. His reign is dated variously: 154-161 CE, or 145-152 CE.

He was defeated twice in battle by his Western Satrap enemy Rudradaman.

== Notes ==
Preceded by: Vashishtiputra Satakarni.	Satavahana ruler (2nd century CE)	Succeeded by: Yajna Sri Satakarni
