= Satakarni =

1st century BCE Indian Satavahana King

- Dakshina–Pathapati
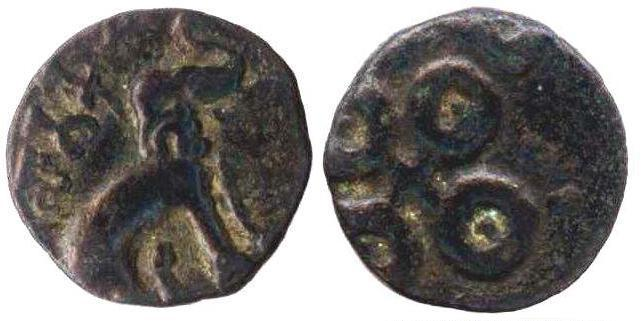
- Early coin of Satakarni. Obverse legend: (𑀲𑀺𑀭𑀺) 𑀲𑀸𑀡𑀺(𑀲), (Siri) Sātakaṇi(sa).

Satavahana king
- Reign: 70 – 50 BCE; 187-177 BCE (according to Ollet Andrew)
- Predecessor: Kanha
- Successor: Satakarni II; Vedasri; Satisiri
- Spouse: Nayanika (Naganika)
- Issue: Vedistri; Satisisri
- Dynasty: Satavahana
- Father: Simuka

Satakarni (also called Sātakarnī I, Brahmi script: 𑀲𑀸𑀢𑀓𑀡𑀺, Sātakaṇi) was the third of the Satavahana kings, who ruled the Deccan region of India. His reign is generally dated to 70-60 BCE, although some authors have claimed 187-177 BCE, and most recently dated to 88-42 BCE. It was thought there were "two Satakarnis" (Satakarni I and Satakarni II), however, Andrew Ollett argues that there is only one Satakarni, as the alleged first Satakarni is assigned ten years, and the second, fifty years by other scholars, but the only dated inscription of this king is Candankheda seal from his reign's year 30, around 60 BCE, and he ruled ca. 88-42 BCE.

== Biography ==
According to the Puranas, the Satavahana king Simuka was succeeded by his brother Krishna (also known as Kanha). According to Matsya Purana, Krishna was succeeded by Mallakarni, but according to other Puranas, he was succeeded by Satakarni. The Nanaghat cave inscription of Satakarni lists his family members: it mentions Simuka's name, but not that of Krishna. Based on this, multiple historians conclude that Satakarni was Simuka's son, and succeeded Krishna. G. V. Rao, however, believes that the inscription is that of a different king Satakarni II; Simuka is mentioned in the inscription as the founder of the dynasty.

According to the Matsya Purana, Satakarni enjoyed a long reign of about 56 years. He seems to have conquered Western Malwa region from the Shungas.

=== Naneghat inscription ===
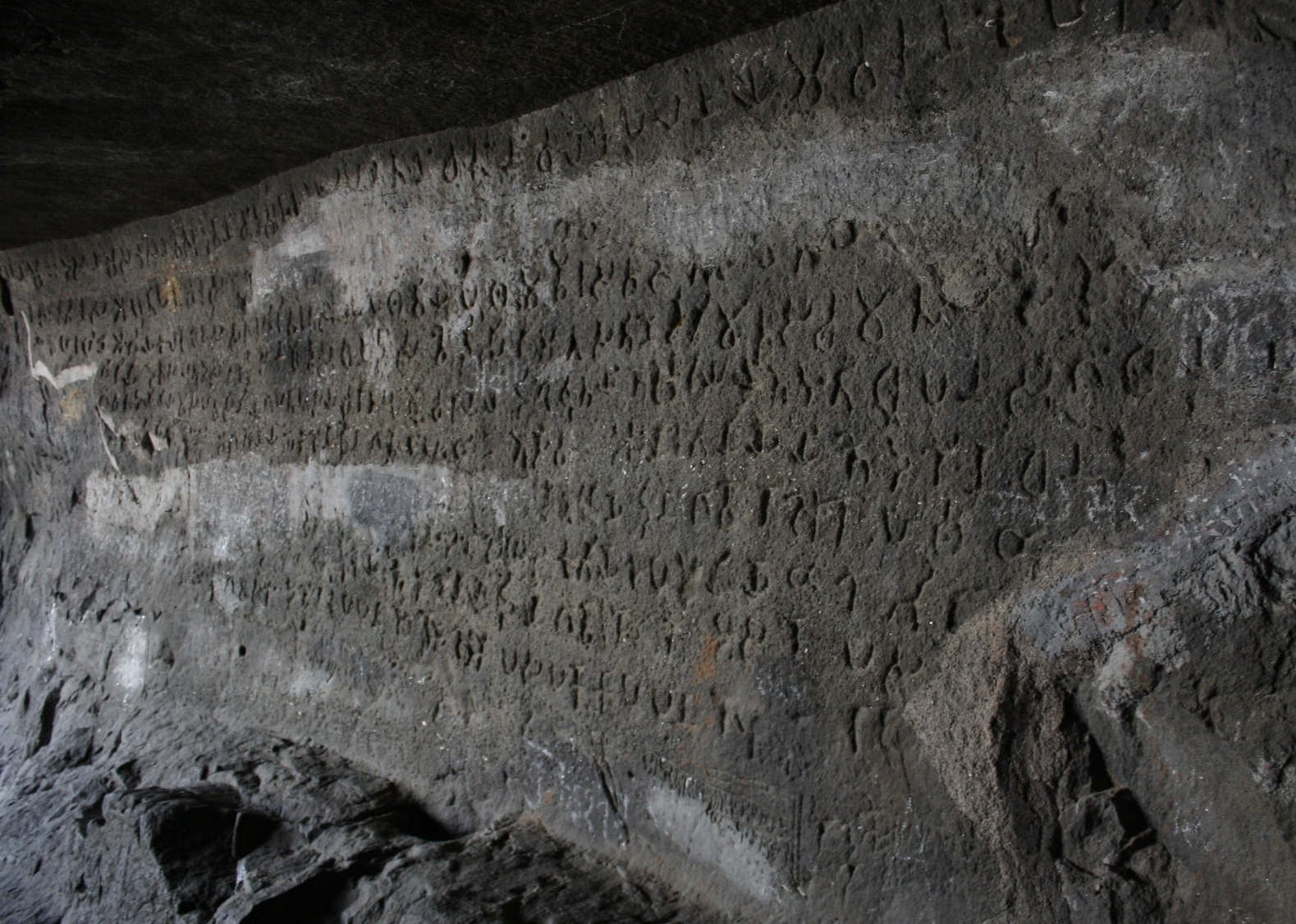
The Naneghat inscription. Dated to 70-60 BCE, it mentions reigning king Satakarni I, his queen Naganika, and his probable father Simuka.

The Naneghat inscription is thought to have been made during the reign of Satakarni I. According to the inscription, he married Nayanika (Naganika), daughter of the Maharathi Tranakayiro Kalalaya, scion of the Amgiya (Ambhiya) family. She wrote the Naneghat inscription, in which she describes Satakarni as "Lord of Dakshinapatha, wielder of the unchecked wheel of Sovereignty". The Naneghat inscription of Naganika suggests that Satakarni performed two horse sacrifices (Aswamedha), to proclaim his sovereignty.

=== Encounter with Kharavela ===
The Hathigumpha inscription of the Kalinga king Kharavela mentions a king named "Satakani" or "Satakamini", who is identified with Satakarni. The inscription describes dispatching of an army and Kharavela's threat to a city variously interpreted as "Masika" (Masikanagara), "Musika" (Musikanagara) or "Asika" (Asikanagara). NK Sahu identifies Asika as the capital of Assaka janapada. According to historian Ajay Mitra Shastri, Asika-nagara was located in the present-day Adam village in the Nagpur district, where a seal mentioning the Assaka has been found.

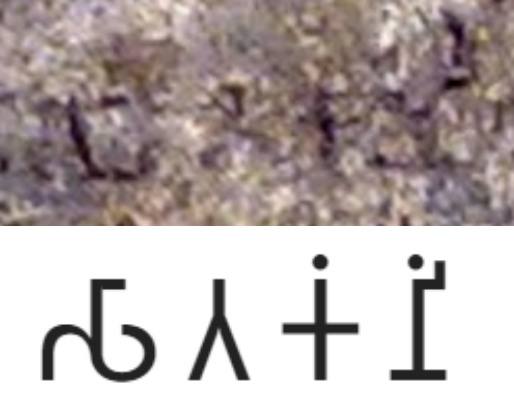
"Satakarni" in the Hathigumpha inscription.

"And in the second year (he), disregarding Satakamini, dispatches to the western regions an army strong in cavalry, elephants, infantry (nara) and chariots (ratha) and by that army having reached the Kanha-bemna, he throws the city of the Musikas into consternation."

— Hathigumpha inscription

The inscription also mentions a river, variously identified with Krishna or with the combined flow of Kanha-Wainganga.

Since the inscription is only partially legible, different scholars interpret the events described in the inscription differently.

- According to K.P. Jayaswal and R. D. Banerji, Kharavela sent an army against Satkarani. Sailendra Nath Sen also states that Kharavela sent out an army that advanced up to river Krishna, and threatened the Musika city located near the junction of Krishna and Musi rivers (near present-day Nalgonda).
- According to Bhagwal Lal, Satakarni wanted to avoid an invasion of his kingdom by Kharavela. So, he sent horses, elephants, chariots and men to Kharavela as a tribute. In the same year, Kharavela captured the city of Masika with assistance of Kusumba Kshatriyas.
- According to Sudhakar Chattopadhyaya, Kharavela's army failed to advanced against Satakarni, and then diverted its course to threaten the city of Asika (Asikanagara).
- According to Alain Daniélou, Kharavela was friendly with Satakarni, and only crossed his kingdom without any clashes.

== Succession ==
He was succeeded by his two young sons Vedasri (Khandasiri or Skandasri) and Sakti-Sri (Sati Sirimata) or Haku-Siri, under the regency of their mother Nayanika.
