= Satakarni II =

1st century BC Indian Satavahana King

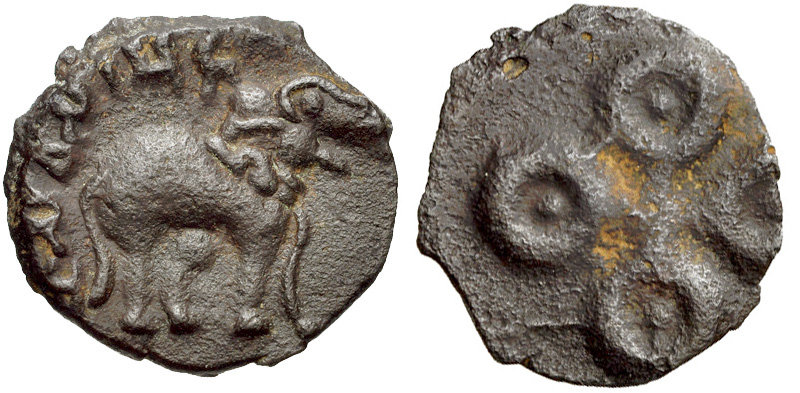
- Coin of the Satavahanas (Andhras), issued in the family name "Satakarni". Mid 1st century BCE-1st century CE.

Satavahana King
- Reign: 50-25 BCE
- Predecessor: Satakarni I
- Successor: Gautamiputra Satakarni
- Dynasty: Satavahana

Sanchi donations (50 BCE- 0 CE)

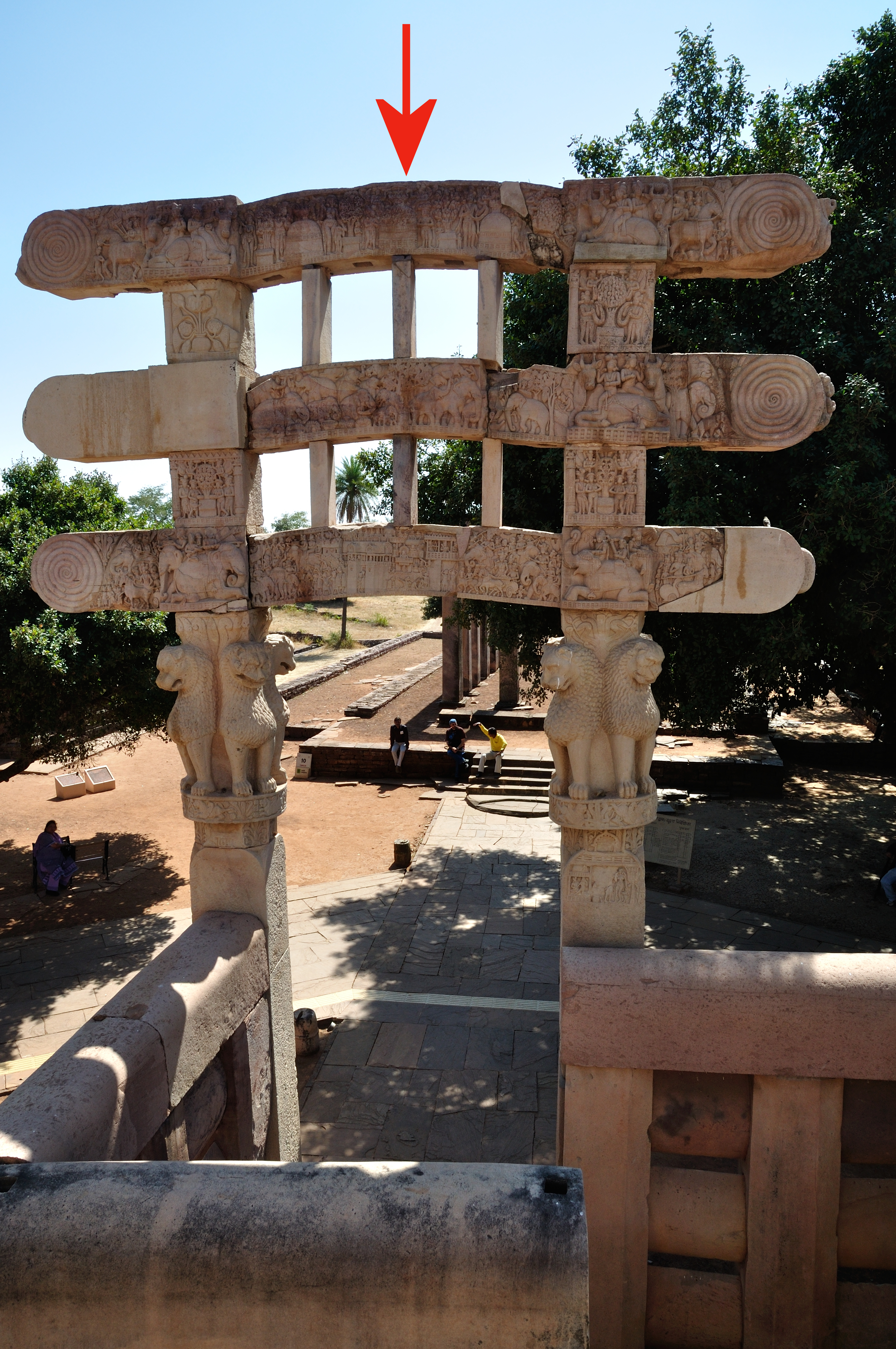
The southern gateway of the Great Stupa at Sanchi was, according to an inscription (see arrow), donated under the rule of "King Satakarni".

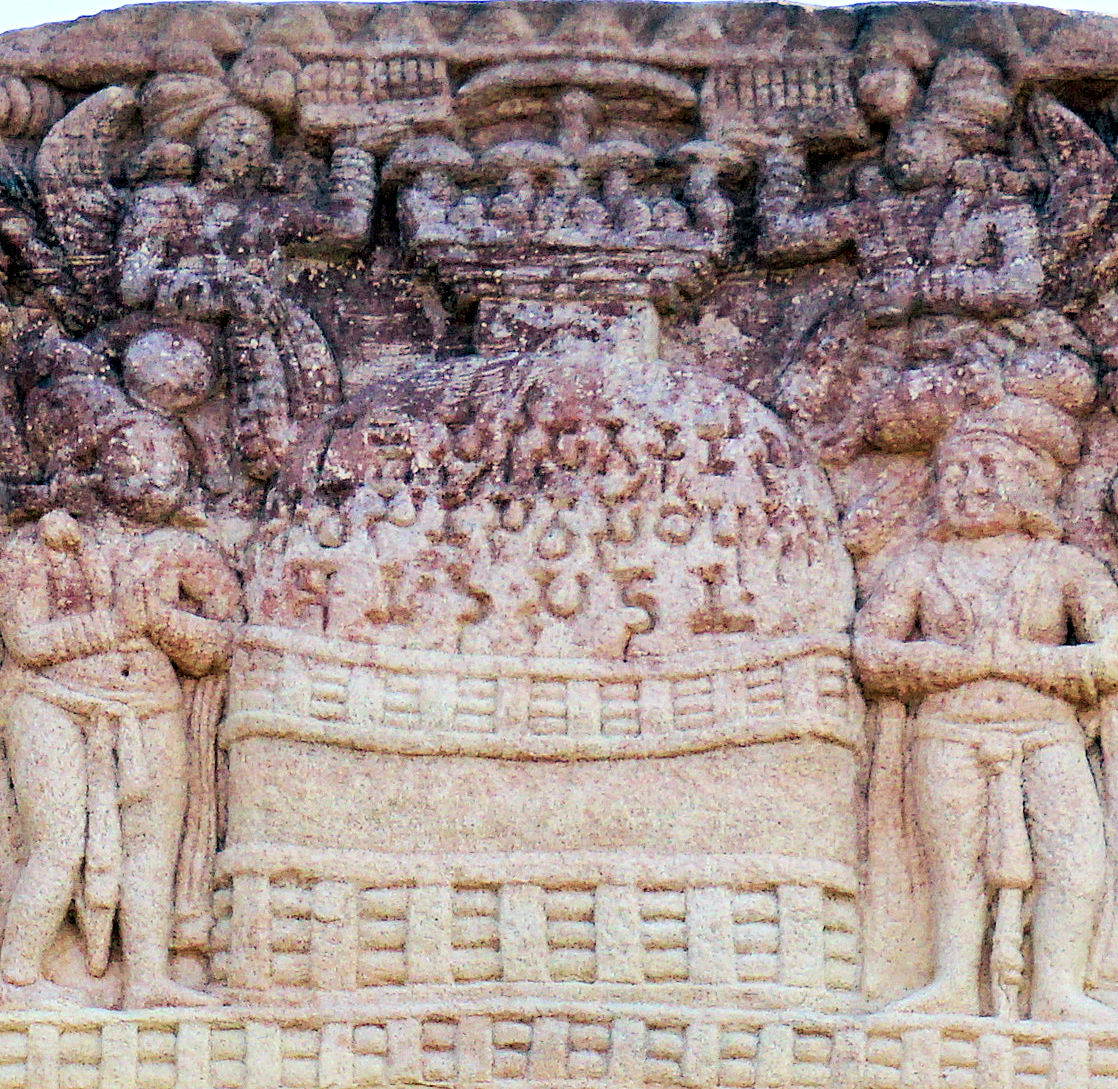
The inscription appears on the stupa at the center of the top architrave, rear portion. It is written in three lines in early Brahmi script over the dome of the stupa in this relief. Dated circa 50 BCE- 0 CE.

Text of the inscription:
𑀭𑀸𑀜𑁄 𑀲𑀺𑀭𑀺 𑀲𑀸𑀢𑀓𑀡𑀺𑀲 / 𑀆𑀯𑁂𑀲𑀡𑀺𑀲 𑀯𑀸𑀲𑀺𑀣𑀻𑀧𑀼𑀢𑀲 / 𑀆𑀦𑀁𑀤𑀲 𑀤𑀸𑀦𑀁
Rāño Siri Sātakaṇisa / āvesaṇisa vāsitḥīputasa / Ānaṁdasa dānaṁ
"Gift of Ananda, the son of Vasithi, the foreman of the artisans of rajan Siri Satakarni"

Satakarni II (Brahmi script: 𑀲𑀸𑀢𑀓𑀡𑀺, Sātakaṇi) was the fourth of the Satavahana kings, who ruled the Deccan region of India. His reign is generally dated to 50-25 BCE. Many scholars claim that Satakarni II didn't exist and hence his reign is disputed.

Satakarni II conquered eastern Malwa from the Shungas or the Kanvas, following the conquest of western Malwa by early Satavahana kings. This allowed him access to the Buddhist site of Sanchi, in which he is credited with the building of the decorated gateways around the original Mauryan Empire and Sunga stupas.

According to the Puranic lists of future kings, "137 years after the accession of Chandragupta Maurya, the Sungas will rule for 112 years and then the Kanvayanas for 45 years whose last king Susharman will be killed by the Andhra Simuka". If the accession of Chandragupta Maurya is dated to 324 BCE, then Simuka started to rule 294 years later, in 30 BCE. Simuka is then said to have ruled for 23 years, and his successor Kanha for 18 years, which would give 10 CE for the accession of his successor Satakarni.

A dedicatory inscription under "King Sri Satakarni" at Sanchi is thought to date to the time of Satakarni II. The Siri-Satakani inscription in the Brahmi script records the gift of one of the top architraves of the Southern Gateway by the artisans of the Satavahana king Satakarni II:

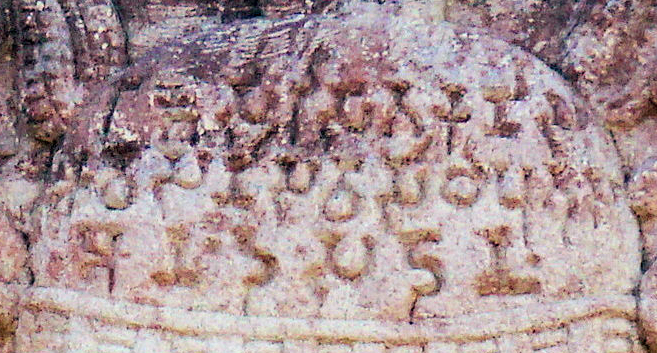

𑀭𑀸𑀜𑁄 𑀲𑀺𑀭𑀺 𑀲𑀸𑀢𑀓𑀡𑀺𑀲 (Rāño Siri Sātakaṇisa)
𑀆𑀯𑁂𑀲𑀡𑀺𑀲 𑀯𑀸𑀲𑀺𑀣𑀻𑀧𑀼𑀢𑀲 (āvesaṇisa vāsitḥīputasa)
𑀆𑀦𑀁𑀤𑀲 𑀤𑀸𑀦𑀁 (Ānaṁdasa dānaṁ)
"Gift of Ananda, the son of Vasithi, the foreman of the artisans of rajan Siri Satakarni"

— Inscription of the Southern Gateway of the Great Stupa

The reign of Satakarni II was followed by the collapse of the Satavahana Empire, and the victories of the Western Satraps ruler Nahapana. The Satavahana Empire would later revive under the rule of Gautamiputra Satakarni.
