= Simuka =

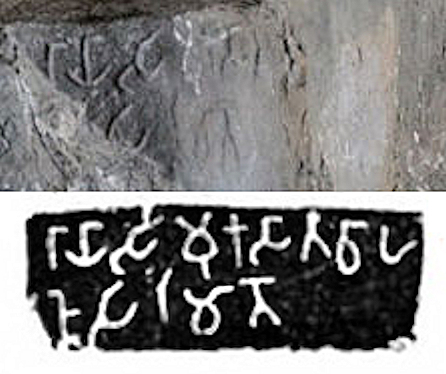
- The Simuka inscription (photograph and rubbing) at the Naneghat Caves, in early Brahmi script: 𑀭𑀸𑀬𑀸 𑀲𑀺𑀫𑀼𑀓 𑀲𑀸𑀢𑀯𑀸𑀳𑀦𑁄 𑀲𑀺𑀭𑀺𑀫𑀢𑁄 Rāyā Simuka - Sātavāhano sirimato "King Simuka Satavahana, the illustrious one"

Satavahana king
- Reign: c. 3rd–2nd century BCE
- Successor: Kanha
- Issue: Satakarni
- Dynasty: Satavahana

Simuka (Brahmi:𑀲𑀺𑀫𑀼𑀓, Si-mu-ka) was an ancient Indian king belonging to the Satavahana dynasty, which ruled the Deccan region. He is mentioned as the first king in a list of royals in a Satavahana inscription at Nanaghat. In the Puranas, the name of the first king is variously spelt as Shivmukha, Sishuka, Sindhuka, Chhismaka, Shipraka, Srimukha, etc. These are believed to be corrupted spellings of "Simuka", resulting from copying and re-copying of manuscripts.

Based on available evidence, Simuka cannot be dated with certainty. According to one theory, he lived in 3rd century BCE; but he is generally thought to have lived in the 1st century BCE. Epigraphical evidence strongly suggests a 1st-century BCE date for Simuka: Simuka seems to be mentioned as the father the acting king Satakarni in the Naneghat inscription dated to 70-60 BCE, itself considered on palaeographical grounds to be posterior to the Nasik Caves inscription of Kanha (probably Simuka's brother) in Cave 19, dated to 100-70 BCE. Recent analysis of sources puts Simuka's reign possibly around 120 - 96 BCE.

According to the Puranic lists of future kings, "137 years after the accession of Chandragupta Maurya, the Sungas will rule for 112 years and then the Kanvayanas for 45 years whose last king Susharman will be killed by the Simuka". If the accession of Chandragupta Maurya is dated to 324 BCE, then Simuka started to rule 294 years later, in 30 BCE.

== Period ==
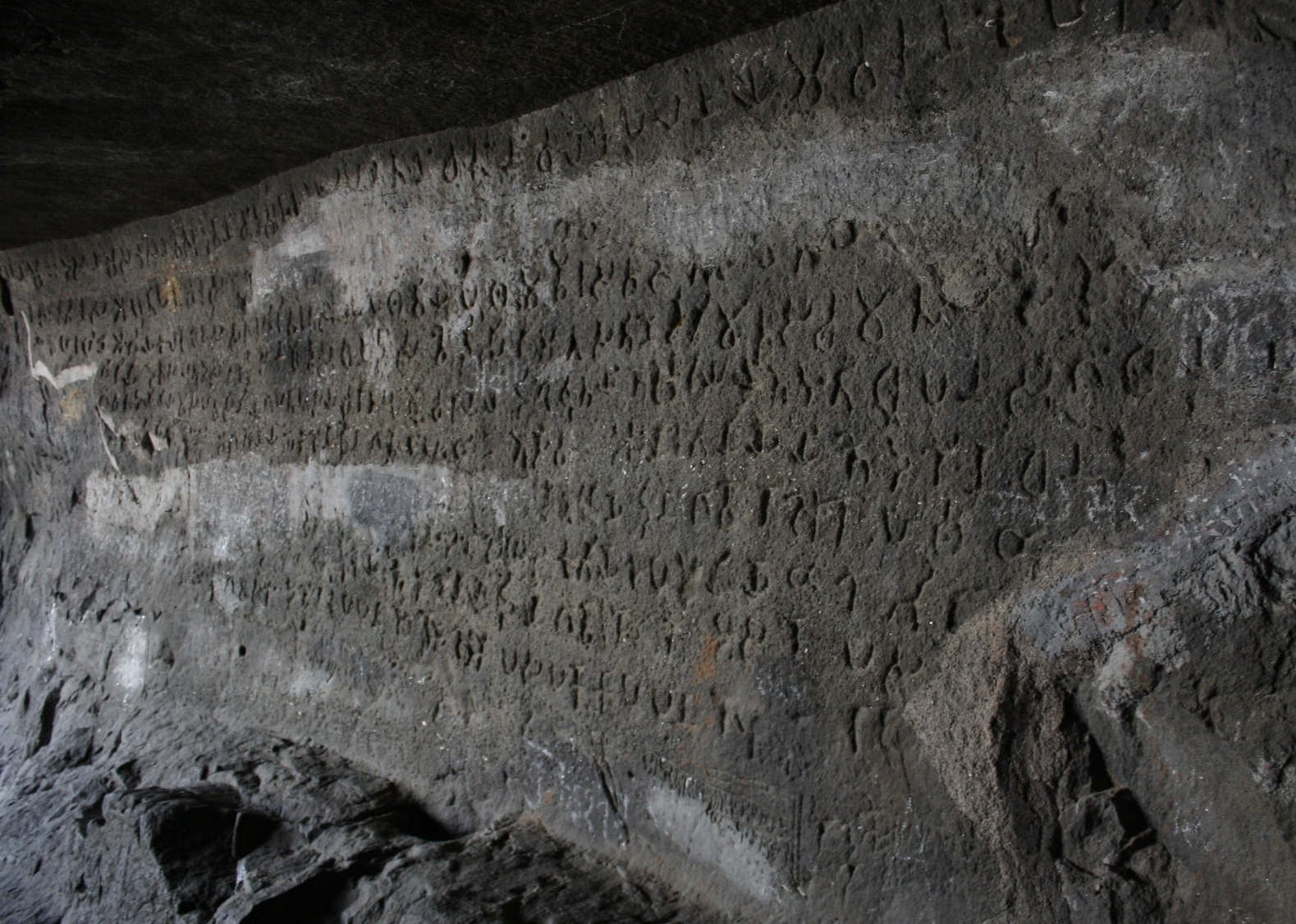
The Naneghat inscription. Dated to 70-60 BCE, it mentions reigning king Satakarni I, his queen Naganika, and his probable father, the "illustrious"" Simuka.

Simuka is mentioned as the first king in a list of royals in a Satavahana inscription at Naneghat. The various Puranas have different names for the founder of the Andhra dynasty: Shishuka in Matsya Purana, Sipraka in Vishnu Purana, Sindhuka in Vayu Purana, Chhesmaka in Brahmanda Purana, and Shudraka or Suraka in Kumarika Khanda of Skanda Purana. These are believed to be corrupted spellings of Simuka, resulting from copying and re-copying of manuscripts.

The Matsya and Vayu Puranas mention that the first Andhra king overthrew the Kanva king Susharman (c. 40–30 BCE). Based on identification of Simuka with this king, some scholars believe that Simuka's reign started in 30 BCE. Scholars supporting this theory include D. C. Sircar, H. C. Raychaudhuri and others.

The Matsya Purana mentions that the Andhra dynasty ruled for 450 years. It is known that the Satavahana rule continued till the beginning of the early 3rd century CE. Therefore, the beginning of the Satavahana rule can be dated to 3rd-2nd century BCE. In addition, Indica by Megasthenes (350 – 290 BCE) mentions a powerful tribe named "Andarae", whose king maintained an army of 100,000 infantry, 2,000 cavalry and 1,000 elephants. If Andarae is identified with the Andhras, this can be considered additional evidence of Satavahana rule starting in 3rd century BCE. According to this theory, Simuka was an immediate successor of the Mauryan emperor Ashoka (304–232 BCE). According to these scholars, the Kanva ruler Susharman was overthrown by a successor of Simuka. The Brahmanda Purana states: "the four Kanvas will rule the earth for 45 years; then (it) will again go to the Andhras". This indicates Satavahanas had been in power before the Kanvas subjugated them; the Kanva rule was ultimately overthrown by a Satavahana king. Scholars supporting this theory include A. S. Altekar, K. P. Jayaswal, V. A. Smith and others.

According to Sudhakar Chattopadhyaya, Simuka was the person who revived the Satavahana rule after the Kanva interregnum, and thus a founder of the 'second' Satavahana dynasty; the compilers of the Puranas have confused his name with the founder of the original dynasty. According to Charles Higham, the coin-based evidence suggests that Simuka's reign ended sometime before 120 BCE. Himanshu Prabha Ray also dates Simuka to somewhere before 100 BCE, Andrew Ollett, in a recent analysis, regards the possible period of his reign as 120 - 96 BCE.

== Biography ==
Not much is known about Simuka. According to Jain legends, he adopted Jainism; but, in the last years of his life, he became a tyrant, for which he was deposed and killed. According to Puranas, last king of Kanva dynasty was killed and succeeded by first king of Andhra dynasty (or Satavahana dynasty). According to the Puranas: "The Andhra Simuka will assail the Kanvayanas and Susarman, and destroy the remains of the Sungas' power and will obtain this earth." He is named as Balipuccha is some texts.

Simuka was succeeded by his brother Kanha, who further extended the empire westward at least as far as Nashik, where an inscription in the name of Kanha is known.

According to Matsya Purana, Krishna (that is, Kanha) was succeeded by Mallakarni, but according to other Puranas, he was succeeded by Satakarni. The Naneghat cave inscription of Satakarni lists his family members: it mentions Simuka's name, but not that of Kanha. Based on this, historians conclude that Satakarni was Simuka's son, and succeeded Kanha.
