= Kanai (surname) =

Kanai (written: かない, 金井) is a Japanese surname. Notable people with the surname include:

- Gibson Kanai, Palauan politician
- Hideta Kanai (金井 秀太; born 1938), Japanese javelin thrower
- Hiroyuki Kanai, Japanese philatelist
- Katsu Kanai, Japanese film director
- Kikuko Kanai (1911–1986), Japanese composer
- Kota Kanai (金井 恒太; born 1986), Japanese shogi player
- Kiyotaka Kanai, astronomer
- Lincoln Kanai, Japanese-American activist
- Mieko Kanai, fiction writer
- Mika Kanai (かない みか), voice actress, also known as Mika Yamadera
- Mitsunari Kanai, aikido teacher
- Norishige Kanai, Japanese astronaut
- Noritoshi Kanai (金井 紀年; 1923–2017), Japanese businessman
- Ryuta Kanai (金井 隆太; born 1989), Japanese footballer
- Taio Kanai (金井 大旺; born 1995), Japanese hurdler
- Vicky Kanai, Palauan politician
- Yuta Kanai, actor
- Yutaka Kanai (1959–1990), Japanese long-distance runner

== Fictional characters ==
- Izumi Kanai, a character in the film Battle Royale
- Kamon Kanai, antagonist in Yakuza 5
