= Vasishthiputra Pulumavi =

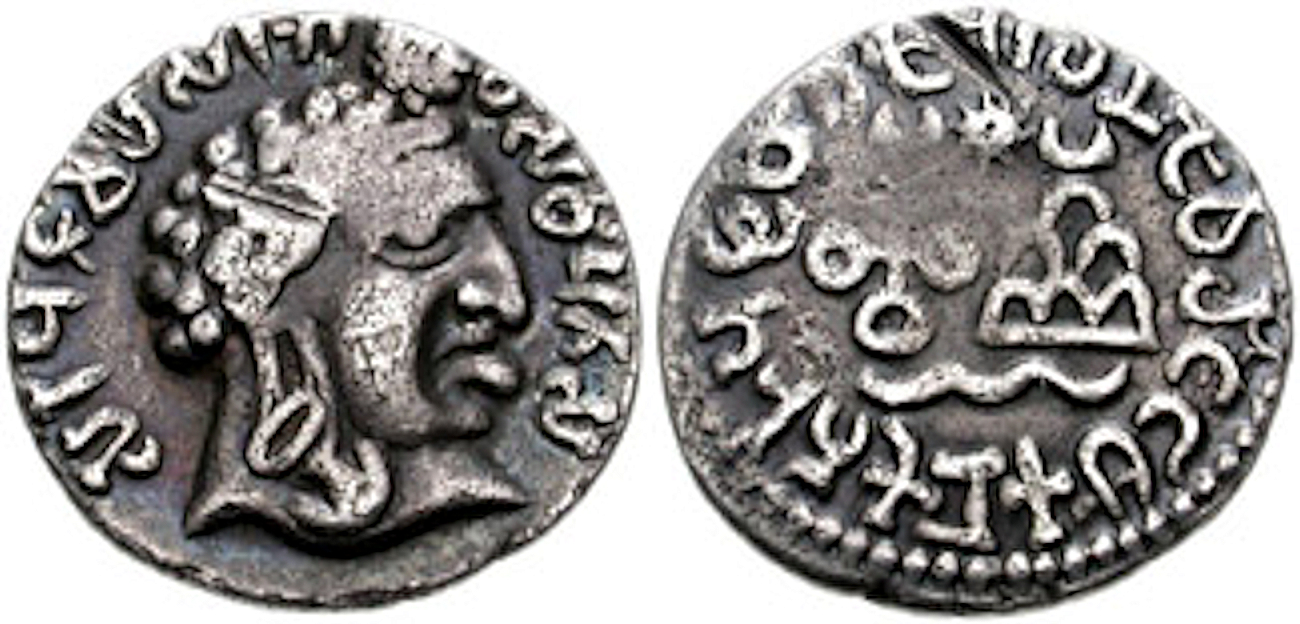
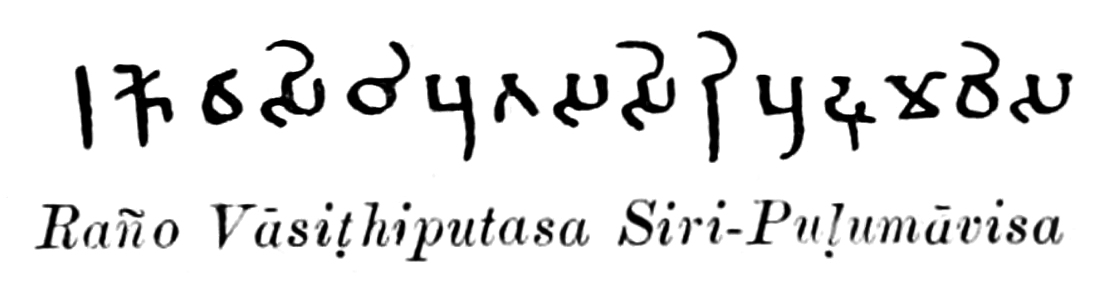
- Bilingual coinage of Sri Vasishthiputra Pulumavi in Prakrit and Old Tamil,and transcription of the obverse Prakrit legend. Obverse: Portrait of the king. Legend in Prakrit in the Brahmi script (starting at 12 o'clock): 𑀭𑀜𑁄 𑀯𑀸𑀲𑀺𑀣𑀺𑀧𑀼𑀢𑀲 𑀲𑀺𑀭𑀺 𑀧𑀼𑀎𑀼𑀫𑀸𑀯𑀺𑀲; Raño Vāsiṭhiputasa Siri-Puḷumāvisa "Of King Lord Pulumavi, son of Vasishthi" Reverse: Ujjain and arched-hill symbols. Legend in Old Tamil/> (starting at 12 o'clock): 𑀅𑀭𑀳𑀡𑀓𑀼 𑀯𑀸𑀳𑀺𑀣𑀺 𑀫𑀸𑀓𑀡𑀓𑀼 𑀢𑀺𑀭𑀼 𑀧𑀼𑀮𑀼𑀫𑀸𑀯𑀺𑀓𑀼 Arahaṇaku Vāhitti Mākaṇaku Tiru Pulumāviku or: Aracanaku Vācitti Makaṇaku Tiru Pulumāviku "Of King Tiru Pulumavi, son of Vasishthi"

Satavahana King
- Reign: c. 85–125 CE or c. 130–159 CE
- Predecessor: Gautamiputra Satakarni
- Successor: Vashishtiputra Satakarni
- Dynasty: Satavahana
- Father: Gautamiputra Satakarni

Vasishthiputra Pulumavi (Brahmi: 𑀯𑀸𑀲𑀺𑀣𑀺𑀧𑀼𑀢 𑀧𑀼𑀎𑀼𑀫𑀸𑀯𑀺, Vāsiṭhiputa Puḷumāvi, IAST: Vāsiṣṭhiputra Śrī Pulumāvi) was a Satavahana king, and the son of Gautamiputra Satakarni. The new consensus for his reign is c. 85-125 CE, although it was earlier dated variously: 110–138 CE or 130–159 CE. He is also referred to as Vasishthiputra Sri Pulumavi. Ptolemy, the second century writer, refers to Pulumavi as Siriptolemaios, a contemporary of the Western satrap, Chastana.

He is said to be the first Satavahana king to rule fully from Dhanyakataka, now Dharanikota in Andhra Pradesh, while some note his capital as Paithan.

== Coinage ==
Some of the lead coins of Pulumavi depict two-masted Indian ships, a testimony to the seafaring and trading capabilities of the Satavahanas during the 1st-2nd century CE. During his rule, Gautami Balasri, the mother of Gautamiputra Satakarni, laid an inscription at Nashik. Pulumavi was succeeded by his younger brother Vashishtiputra Satakarni.

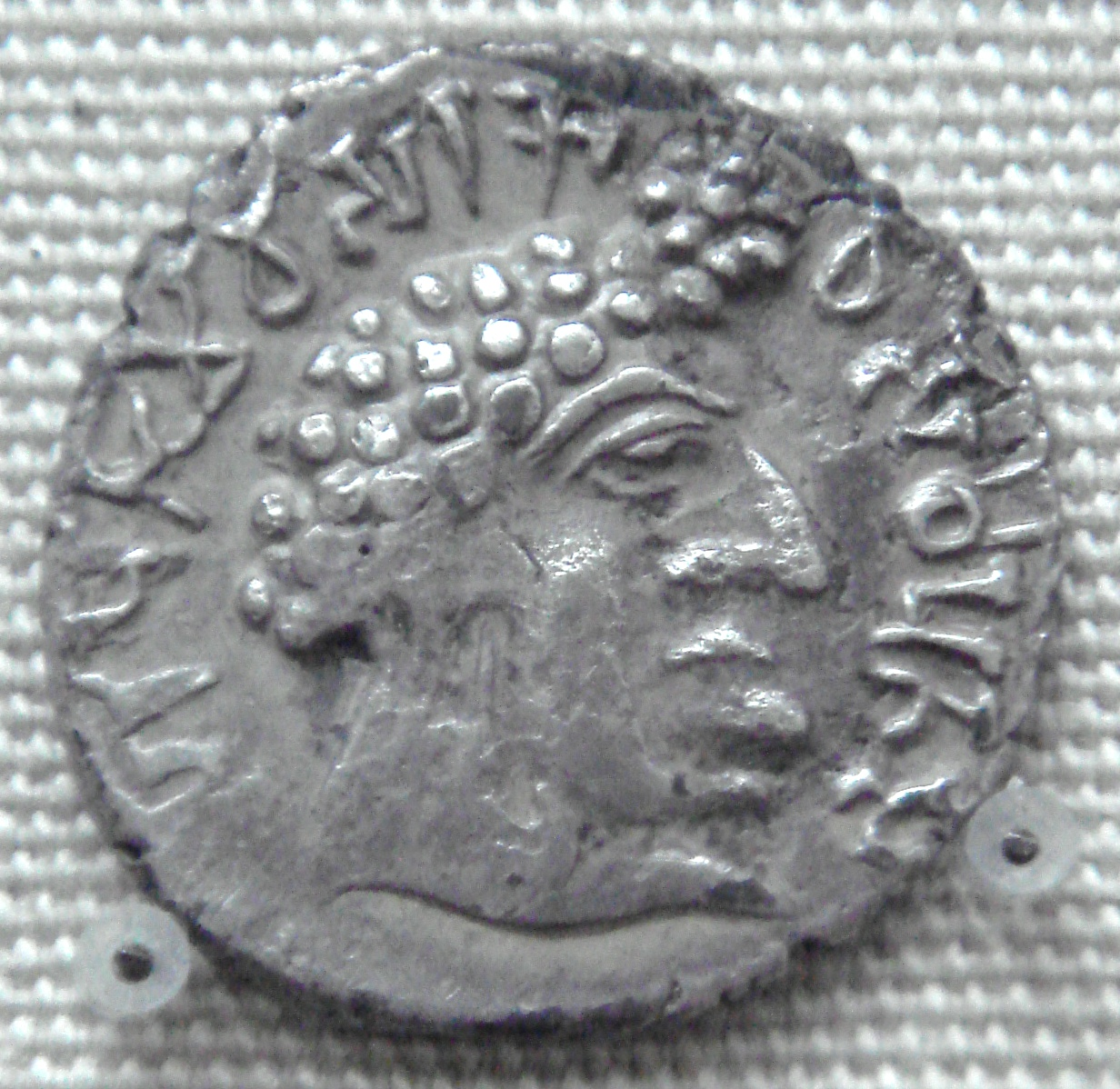
Coinage of Vashishthiputra Sri Pulumavi, with Prakrit legend in the Brahmi script (starting at 12 o'clock):
𑀭𑀜𑁄 𑀯𑀸𑀲𑀺𑀣𑀺𑀧𑀼𑀢𑀲 𑀲𑀺𑀭𑀺 𑀧𑀼𑀎𑀼𑀫𑀸𑀯𑀺𑀲
Raño Vāsiṭhiputasa Siri-Puḷumāvisa
"Of King Lord Pulumavi, son of Vasishthi".

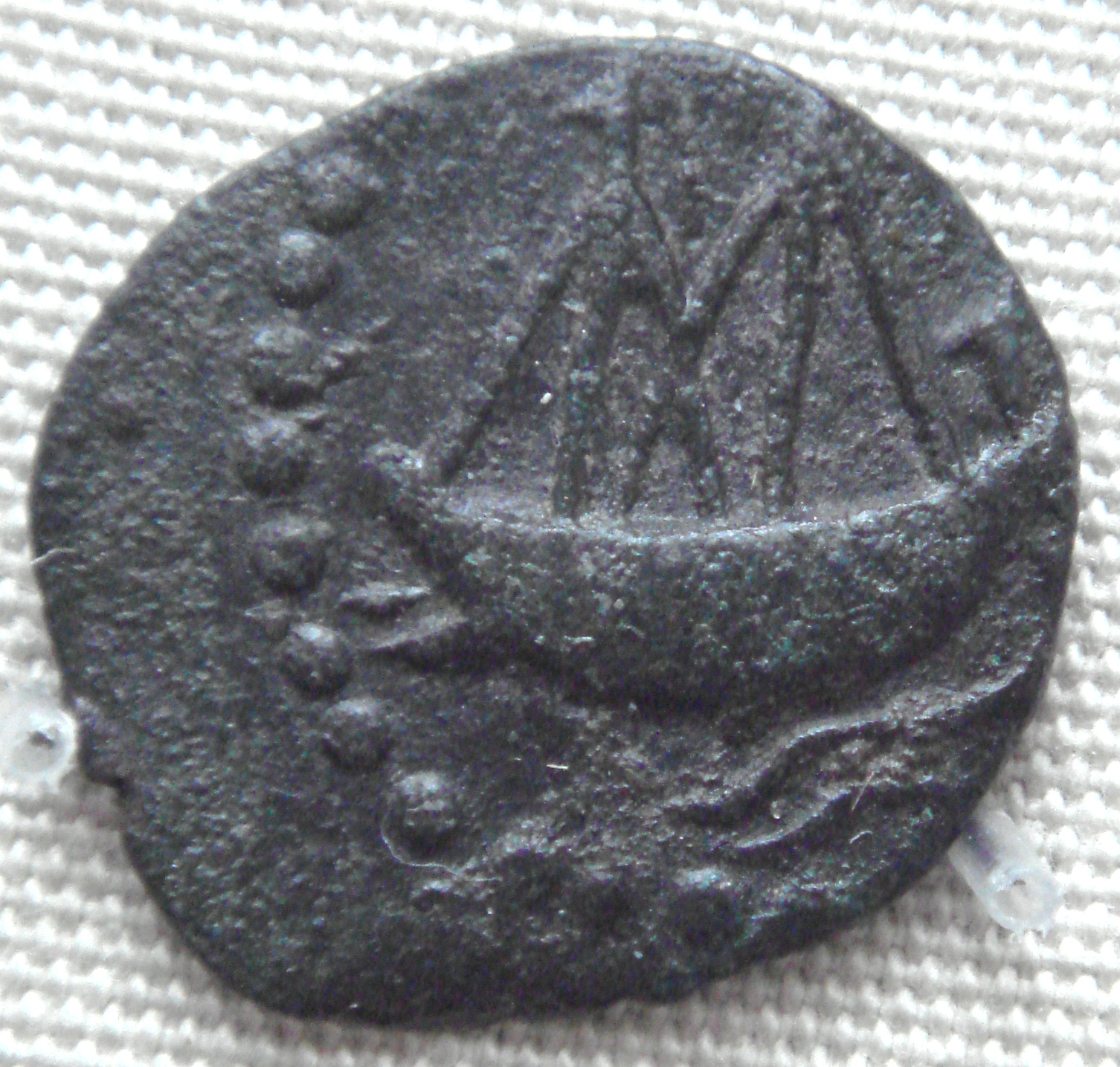
Indian ship on lead coin of Vasishthiputra Pulumavi.

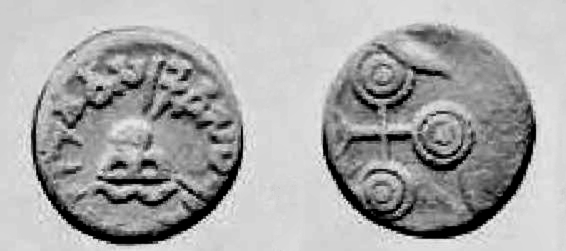
Coinage of Vashishthiputra Sri Pulumavi, with Prakrit legend in the Brahmi script (starting at 12 o'clock):
𑀭𑀜𑁄 𑀯𑀸𑀲𑀺𑀣𑀺𑀧𑀼𑀢(𑀲 𑀲𑀺𑀭𑀺 𑀧𑀼)𑀎𑀼𑀫𑀸𑀯𑀺𑀲
Raño Vāsiṭhiputa(sa Siri-Pu)ḷumāvisa
"Of King Lord Pulumavi, son of Vasishthi".

== Nashik Pandavleni Caves ==
Near Nashik, Cave No.3 of Pandavleni Caves was built by Queen Gotami Balasiri during the reign of Pulumavi, and also received a dedication by Sri Pulumavi himself. The cave was dedicated to the Samgha. Based on inscription no. 3, the mountain on which the caves are present was known as Mount Tiranhu during the time of Sri Pulumavi and the area around Nashik caves was known as Sudasana, which was a part of district/province known as Govardhana. Vasishthiputra Pulumavi granted Samalipada in exchange of Sudasana for Buddhist monks.

Cave No.3, Pandavleni Caves
One long inscription (inscription No.2) in the 19th year of Satavahana king Sri Pulumavi (2nd century CE), explaining that Queen Gotami Balasiri, mother of glorious king Gotamiputra, caused this cave to be built and gave it to the Samgha. There is also another long inscription (inscription No.3) by Sri Pulumavi himself, also in the 22nd year of his reign.
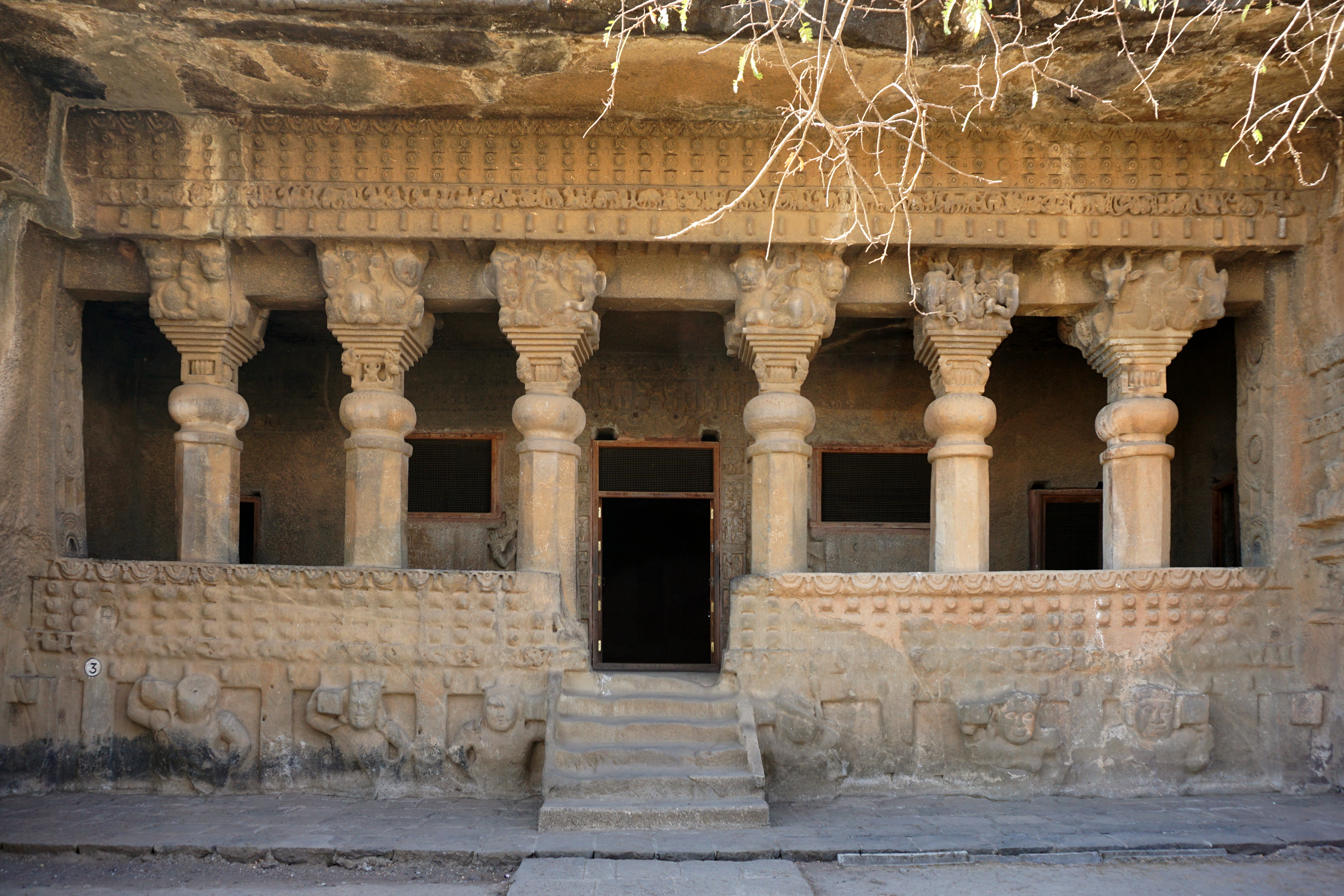
Cave 3, exterior

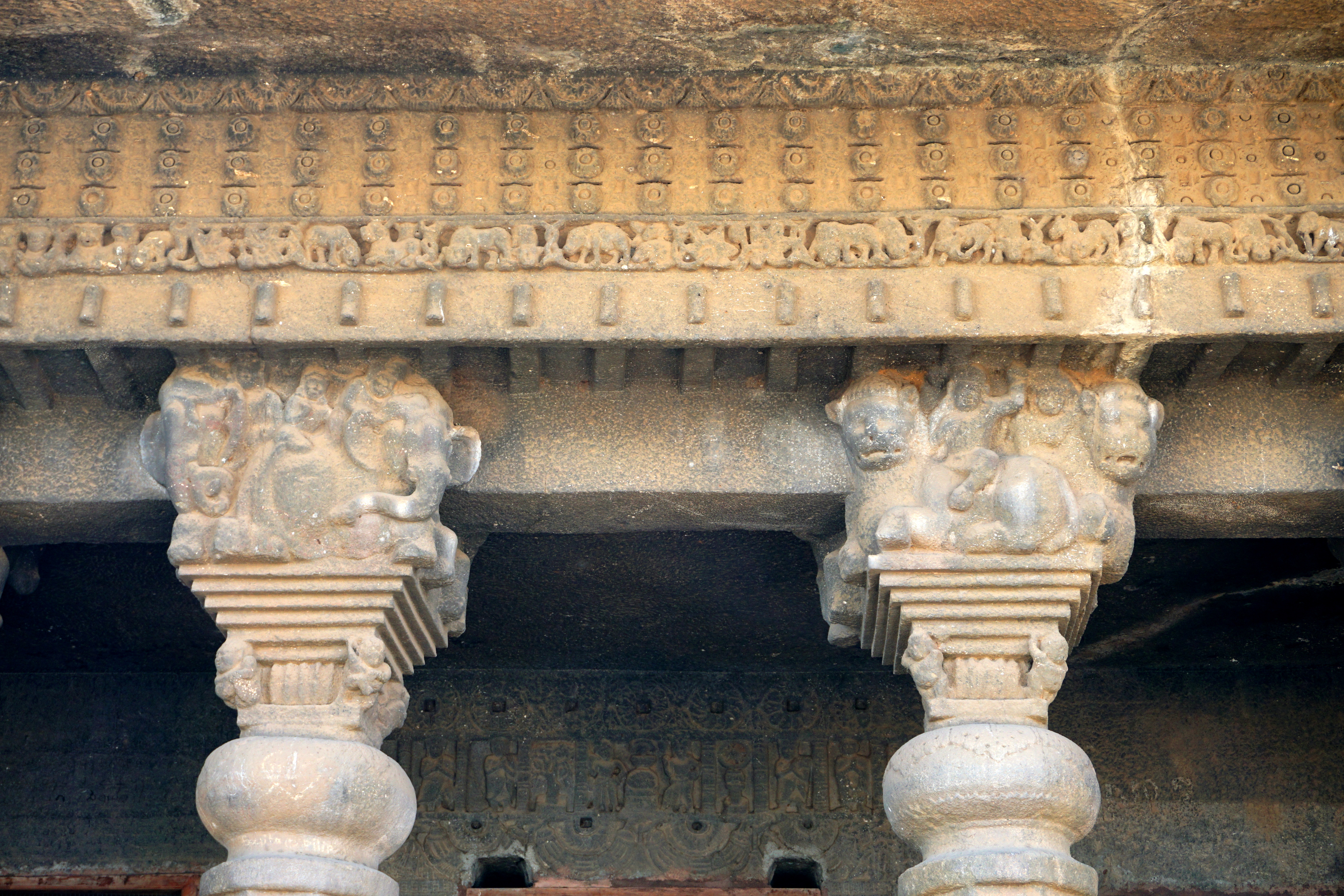
Cave 3, pillars

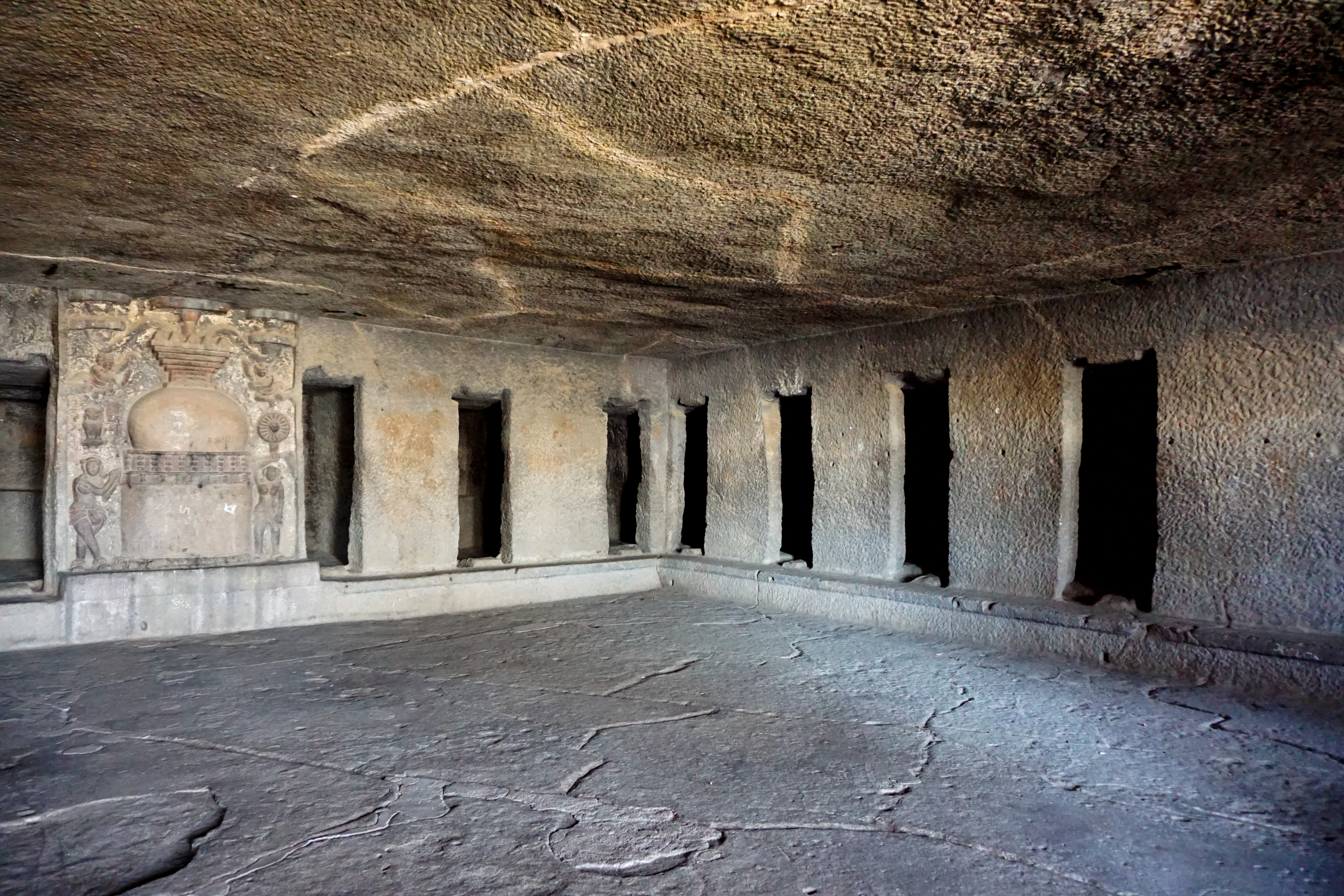
Interior

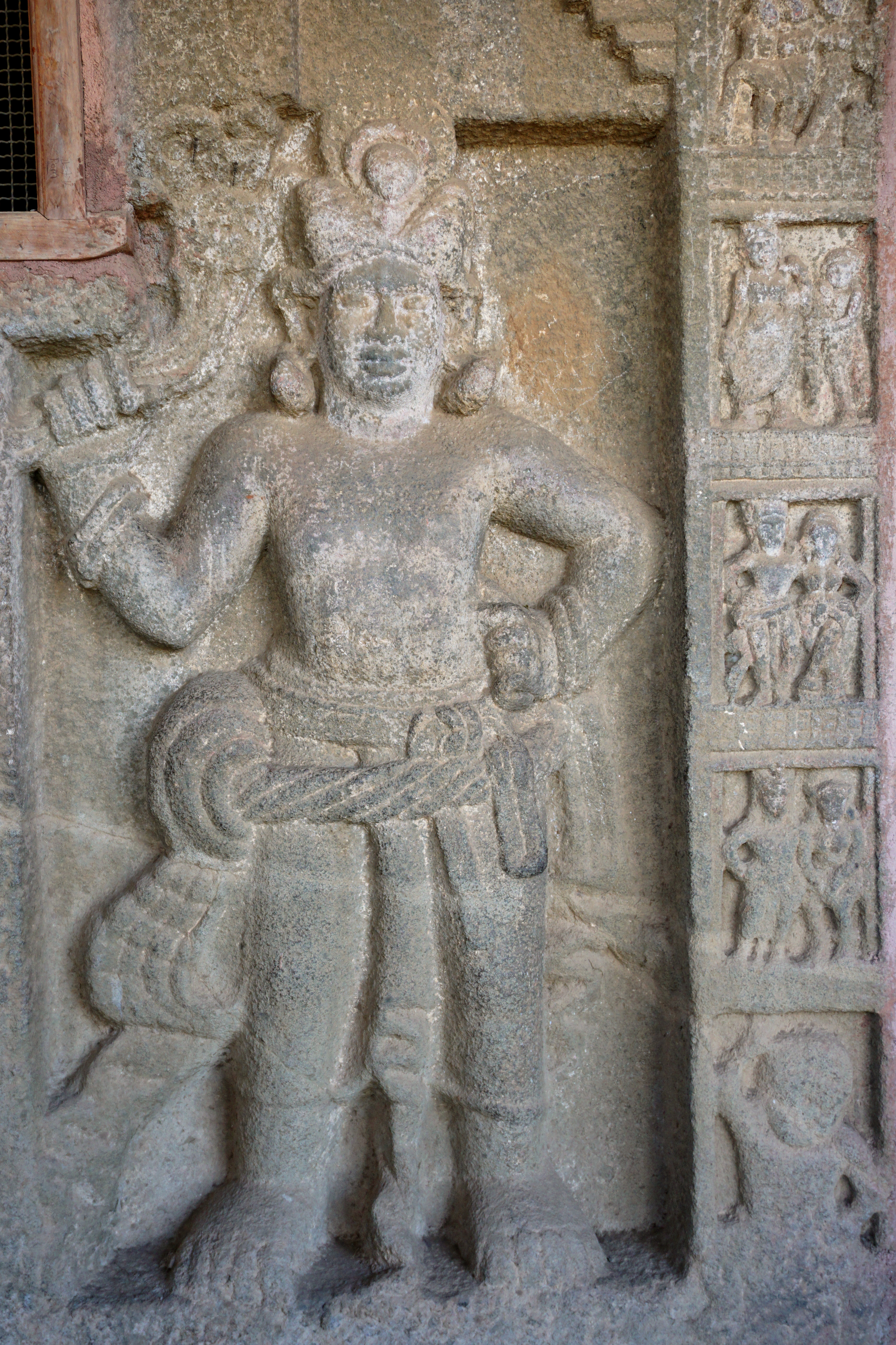
Dvarapala

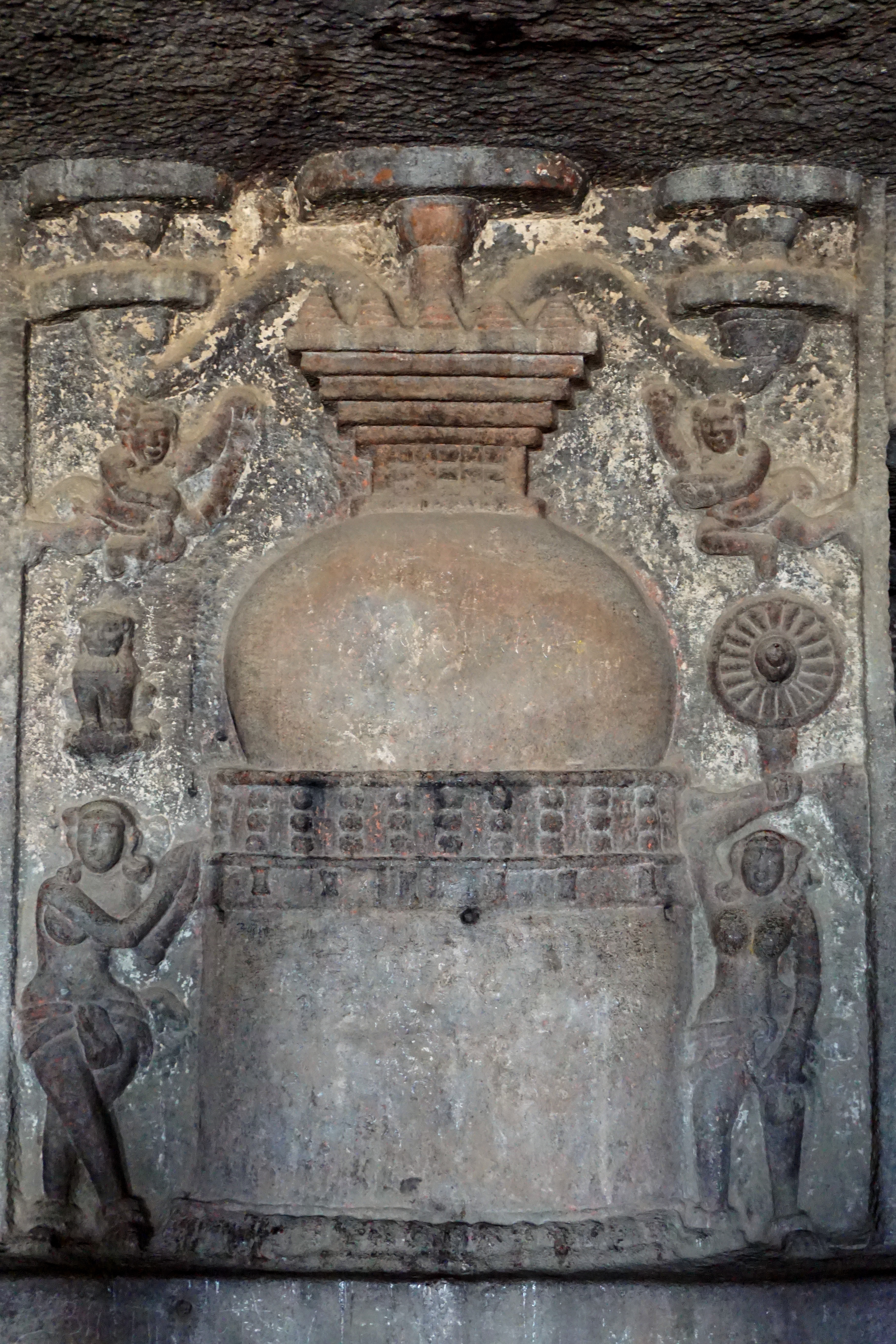
Chaitya relief

Inscription of Sri-Pulumavi
Nasik Cave No.3, inscription No.3 (reign of Sri Pulumavi)

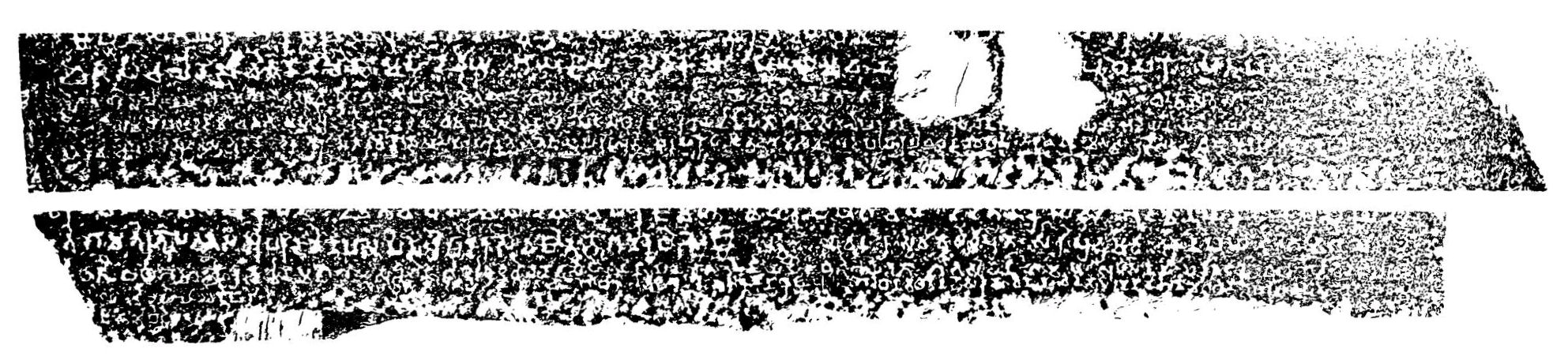
Inscription of Sri-Pulumavi, Nasik cave No.3.

" Success ! The lord of Navanara, Siri-Pulumavi Vasithiputa, commands Sivakhandila, the officer at Govadhana: The village of Sudisana here in the Govadhana district on the Southern road, which by us, in the 19th year, on the 13th day of the 2nd fortnight of summer, . . . . by the Samanas of Dhanamkata who [dwell] here on mount Tiranhu ......, has been given to be owned by the Bhikshus of that fraternity, the Bhadayaniyas dwelling in the Queen's Cave, to produce a perpetual rent for the care of the cave meritoriously excavated, - in exchange for this gift, -the village of Sudasana,- we give the village of Samalipada, here in the Govadhana district on the Eastern road; and this village of Samalipada, .......by the Maha-Aryaka, you must deliver to be owned by the Bhikshus of the school of the Bhadayaniyas dwelling in the Queen's Cave, to produce a perpetual rent for the care of the cave meritoriously excavated; and to this village of Samalipada we grant the immunity belonging to monk's land, (making it) not to be entered (by royal officers), not to be touched (by any of them), not to be dug for salt, not to be interfered with by the district police, (in short) to enjoy all kinds of immunities. With all these immunities you must invest it; and this donation of the village of Samalipada and the immunities take care to have registered here at Sudasana. And by the (officers) entrusted with the abrogation of the (previous) donation of the Sudasana village it has been ordered. Written by the Mahdsendpati Medhnna ....., kept (?) by the ....... of deeds (?). The deed was delivered in the year 22, the 7th day of the . . fortnight of summer; executed by .... . (?). With a view for the well-being of the inhabitants of Govadhana, Vinhupala proclaims the praise of the Lord: Obeisance to the Being exalted in perfection and majesty, the excellent Jina, the Buddha."

— Nasik Caves inscription of Sri-Pulumavi, Cave No.3

== Karla caves inscription ==
Vasishthiputra Pulumavi inscription
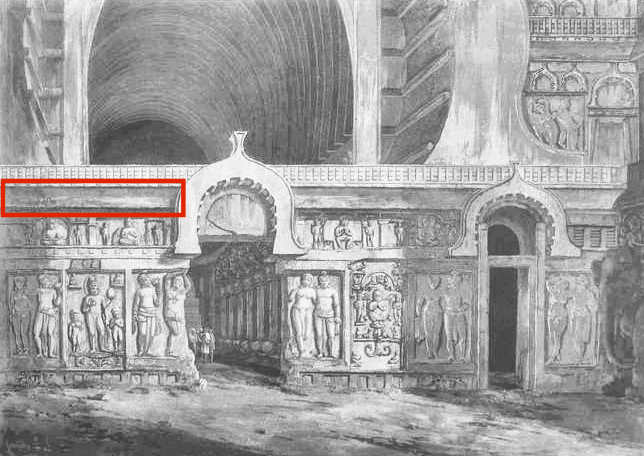
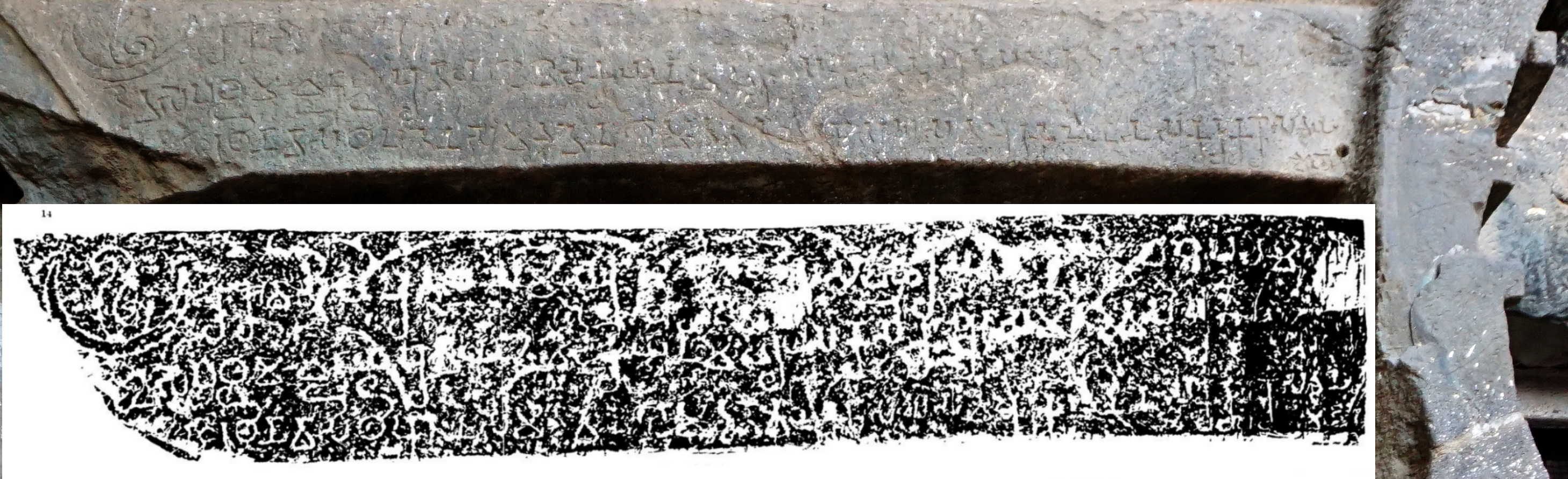
Karla inscription of Vasishthiputra Pulumavi, left of the main entrance

On the lintel to the left of the main entrance to the Great Chaitya at Karla Caves, facing the inscription of Nahapana and posterior to it by a generation, there is also an inscription by Satavahana ruler Sri Pulumayi, that is, Vasishthiputra Pulumavi:

In the seventh year of the king Sri Pulamavi, son of Vasithi, in the fifth fortnight of summer, on the first day, on the above, by the Maharathi Somadeva son of Vasithi, the son of the Maharathi Mitradeva son of Kosiki, of the Okhalakiyas, there was given to the community of Valuraka, of the Valuraka caves, a village with its taxes ordinary and extraordinary, with its income fixed or proportional.

— Inscription 14 of Sri Pulumavi.

Preceded by Gautamiputra Satakarni	Satavahana ruler 2nd century CE	Succeeded by Vashishtiputra Satakarni
