= Kanhaiyalal =

Kanhaiyalal may refer to:

- Kanhaiyalal (actor) (1910–1982), Bollywood actor in Hindi films
- Kanhaiyalal Maneklal Munshi, (1887–1971), Indian independence movement activist, politician, writer and educationist
- Kanhaiyalal Sethia (1919–2008), Rajasthani and Hindi poet
- Murder of Kanhaiya Lal, 2022 murder in Udaipur, India

== See also ==
- Kanhaiya (disambiguation)
- Kanha (disambiguation)
