= Vashishtiputra Satakarni =

Satavahana king from 158 to 165

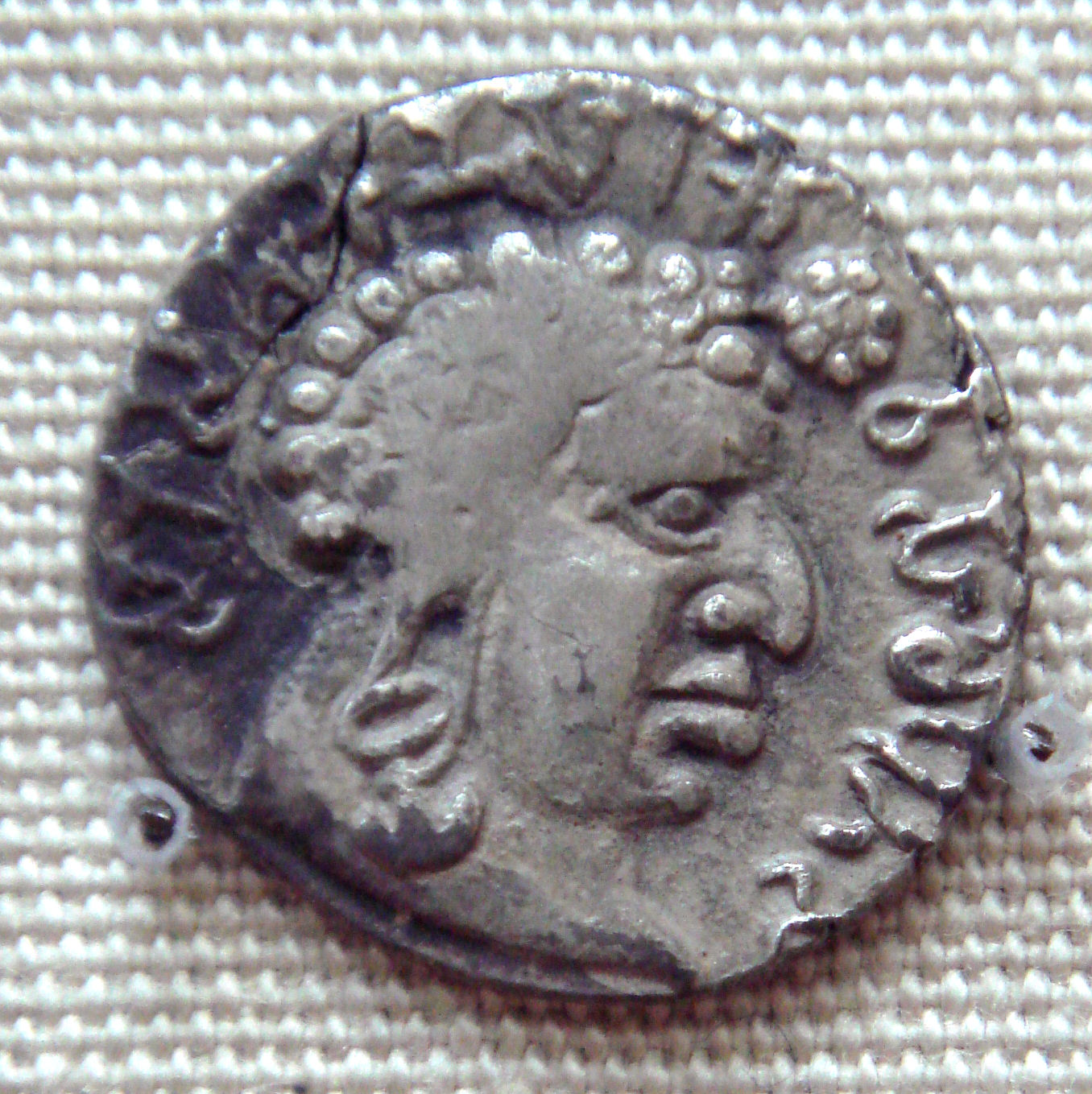
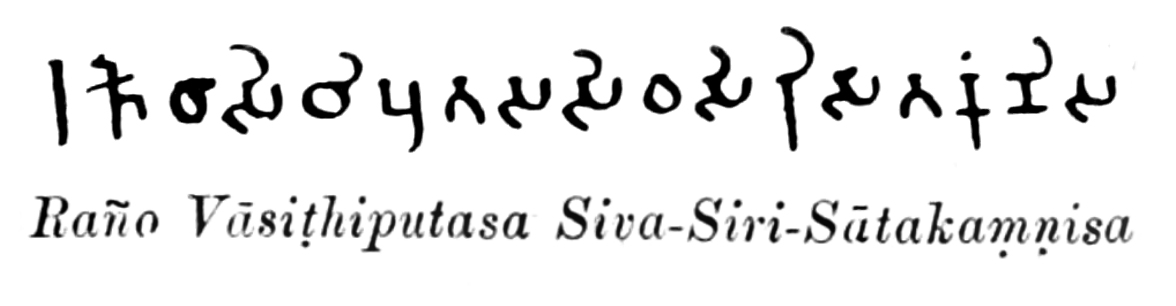
- Vashishtiputra Sri Satakarni, with coin legend in the Brahmi script.

Satavahana King
- Reign: 158–165
- Predecessor: Vasishthiputra Pulumavi
- Successor: Yajna Sri Satakarni
- Dynasty: Satavahana
- Religion: Vedic Hinduism

Vashishtiputra Sātakarni (Brahmi: 𑀯𑀸𑀲𑀺𑀣𑀺𑀧𑀼𑀢 𑀲𑀸𑀢𑀓𑀁𑀁𑀡𑀺, Vāsiṭhiputa Sātakaṃṇi) was a Satavahana king, who ruled the Deccan region in India, during the 2nd century CE. He was the brother of Yajna Sri Satakarni, his regnal successor and Vasishthiputra Pulumavi, his regnal predecessor. His reign is dated 158–165 CE.

Vashishtiputra Sātakarni was in great conflict with the Scythian Western Kshatrapas in the West, but he eventually married the daughter of Rudradaman I of the Western Kshatrapas dynasty, in order to forge an alliance. The inscription relating the marriage between Rudradaman I's daughter and Vashishtiputra Satakarni appears in a cave at Kanheri:

"Of the queen ... of the illustrious Vashishtiputra Satakarni, descended from the race of Karddamaka kings, (and) daughter of the Mahakshatrapa Ru(dra)....... .........of the confidential minister Sateraka, a water-cistern, the meritorious gift.

— Kanheri inscription of Rudradaman I's daughter".

Later, however, Vashishtiputra Sātakarni was defeated by his father-in-law in battle, with serious effect on Sātavāhana power and prestige:

"Rudradaman (...) who obtained good report because he, in spite of having twice in fair fight completely defeated Satakarni, the lord of Dakshinapatha, on account of the nearness of their connection did not destroy him."

— Junagadh rock inscription of Rudradaman

== Gallery ==
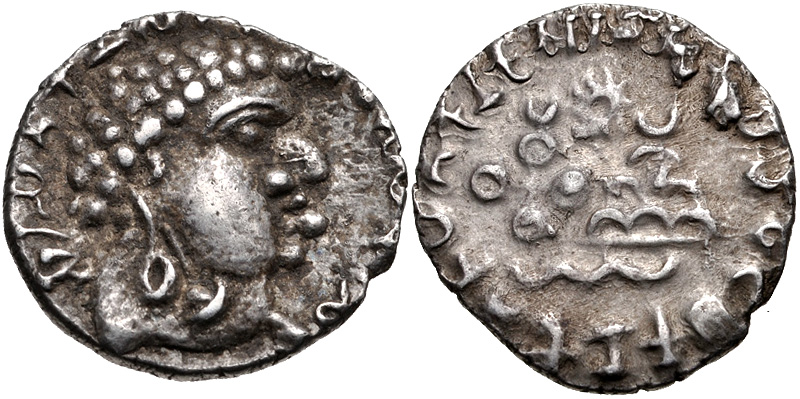
Coin of Vasisthiputra Satakarni

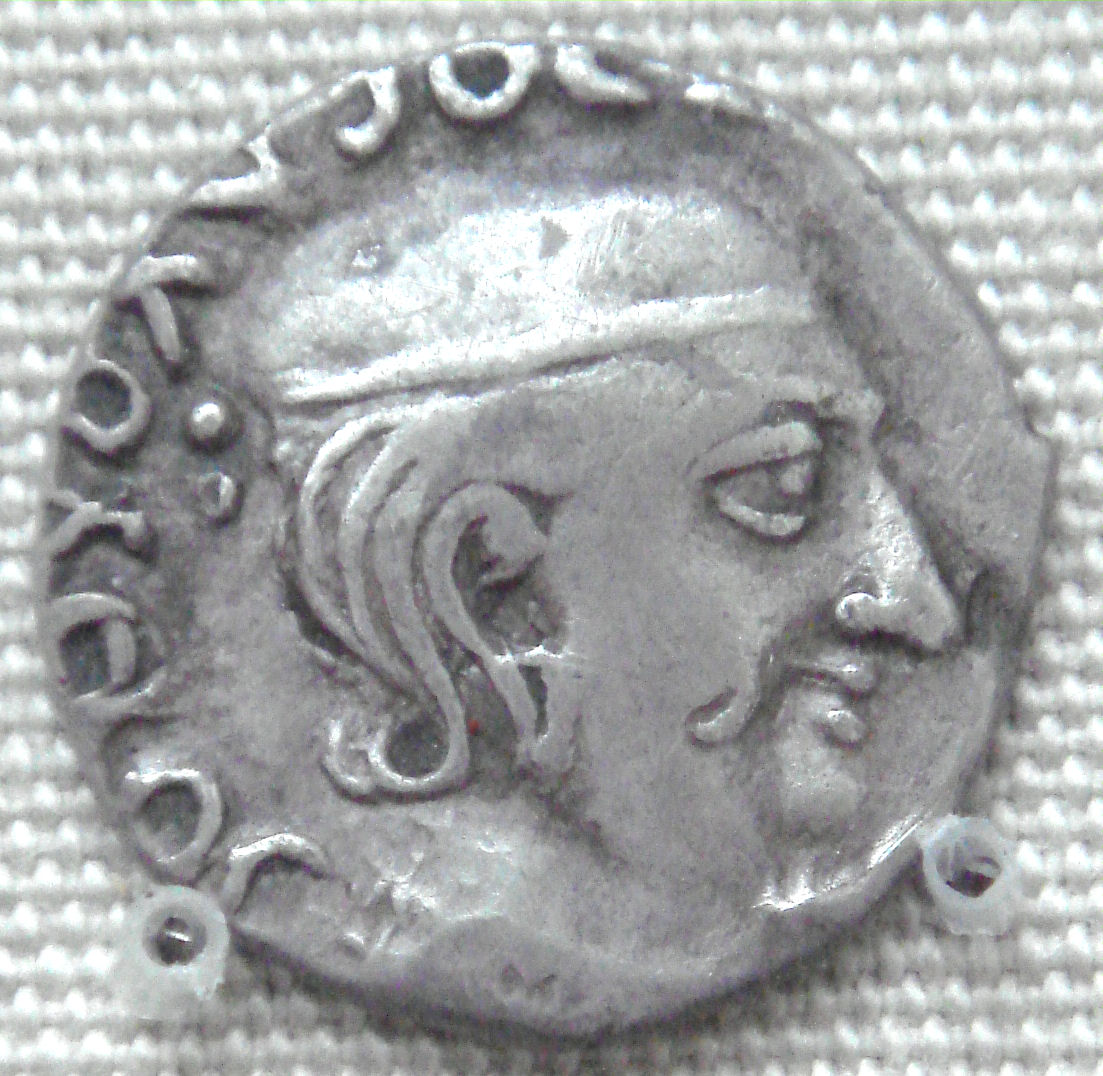
Coin of Rudradaman I, whose daughter was married to Vashishtiputra Satakarni to form an alliance.

== Notes ==
Vashishtiputra Satakarni Satavahana
Preceded by Vasisthiputra Sri Pulamavi	Satavahana ruler 2nd century	Succeeded by Shivaskanda Satakarni
