= Kanhaiya Geet =

Kanhaiya Geet is a group song in the East Rajasthan belt of rural people, especially Gurjar, Meena community, play with the help of ghera-noubat (घेरा-नौबत). These traditional practices increase fraternity, brotherhood, cooperation between two villages.

== Kanhaiya Dangal ==
The fest in which 2 or more village participate for the singing of Kanhaiya Geet, this kind of tournament-type event is called Kanhaiya Dangal. this kind of events are generally organised in minimum 2 or 3 months on those village which are taking interest in Kanhaiya Geet.

Before the event hosting village send an invitation letter to participating villages, this is generally called "kaagaj bejna". If the invited village accepts the offer then they can officially participate. The hosting village doing best guestship of Kanhaiya geet artist of another village.

== Influenced area ==
The expansion of these songs are in the Sawai Madhopur, Tonk, Karouli, Dausa, Bharatpur, Alwar, Jaipur District's rural areas, these songs are especially major influential effect in the Madhopur region. Many villages, i.e.- Shafipura, jharoda, sirsali, nadoti, divsya, ranoli, Chakeri, Bardala, Sop, Decwa, Jaadawata. Selu, Ninoni, Olwada, Khandip, and many more take interest in this type song.

== Importance ==
The major importance is increasing brotherhood and mutual cooperation between two villages.
