= Kanha (Satavahana dynasty) =

Satavahana king

Satavahana king
- Reign: c. 2nd or 1st century BCE
- Predecessor: Simuka
- Successor: Sri Satakarni (according to Puranas)
- Dynasty: Satavahana

Inscription of king Kanha (100–70 BCE)

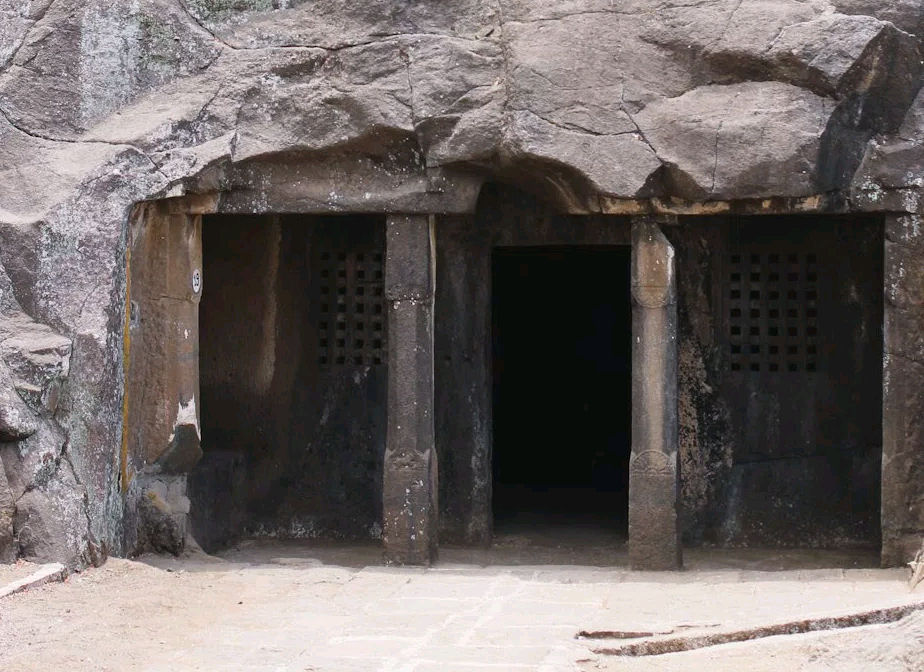
Cave No.19 of Satavahana king Kanha at the Nasik Caves, 1st century BCE.

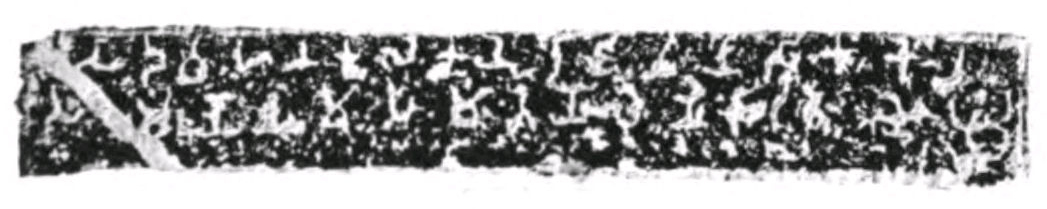
Inscription of king Kanha in cave No.19, Nasik Caves. This is the oldest known Satavahana inscription, circa 100–70 BCE.
In Brahmi script:𑀲𑀸𑀤𑀯𑀸𑀳𑀦𑀓𑀼𑀮𑁂 𑀓𑀦𑁆𑀳𑁂𑀭𑀸𑀚𑀺𑀦𑀺 𑀦𑀸𑀲𑀺𑀓𑁂𑀦 𑀲𑀫𑀡𑁂𑀦 𑀫𑀳𑀸𑀫𑀸𑀢𑁂𑀡 𑀮𑁂𑀡 𑀓𑀸𑀭𑀢
Sādavāhanakule Kanhe rājini Nāsikakena Samaṇena mahāmāteṇa leṇa kārita
"Under King Kanha of the Satavahana family this cave has been caused to be made by the officer in charge of the Sramanas at Nasik".

Kanha (Brahmi script:𑀓𑀦𑁆𑀳, Ka-nha) was a ruler of the Satavahana dynasty of India. Historian Himanshu Prabha Ray assigns his reign to the period c. 100–70 BCE.

Kanha has been mentioned as "Krishna" (IAST: Kṛṣṇa) in the Puranas. According to the Puranic genealogy, he was the brother of the first Satavahana king Simuka (whose name varies according to the different Puranas).

== Nasik cave ==
Besides the legendary Puranas, Kanha's existence is also supported by an epigraphic record at Cave No.19 in the Nasik Caves. He is identified with the "Kanha-raja" (King Kanha) of "Satavahana-kula" (Satavahana family) mentioned in a Nashik cave inscription. The inscription states that the cave was excavated by maha-matra (officer-in-charge) of the shramanas during Kanha's reign. Also, the term maha-matra, well known in Ashokan inscriptions, indicates that the early Satavahanas followed the Mauryan administrative model.

Cave No19 at the Nasik Caves is located on the ground floor, to the left of the entrance of Cave No.18, and right under cave No.20. Cave No.19 has one inscription mentioning the dedication by a government officer during the rule of king Krishna of the Satavahanas:

𑀲𑀸𑀤𑀯𑀸𑀳𑀦𑀓𑀼𑀮𑁂 𑀓𑀦𑁆𑀳𑁂𑀭𑀸𑀚𑀺𑀦𑀺 𑀦𑀸𑀲𑀺𑀓𑁂𑀦 𑀲𑀫𑀡𑁂𑀦 𑀫𑀳𑀸𑀫𑀸𑀢𑁂𑀡 𑀮𑁂𑀡 𑀓𑀸𑀭𑀢
Sādavāhanakule Kanhe rājini Nāsikakena Samaṇena mahāmāteṇa leṇa kārita
"Under King Kanha of the Satavahana family, this cave has been caused to be made by the officer in charge of the Sramanas at Nasik."

— Inscription of Cave No.19

This makes Cave No.19 one of the earliest to be excavated at Nasik Caves.
