= Yajna Sri Satakarni =

2nd-century Satavahana king

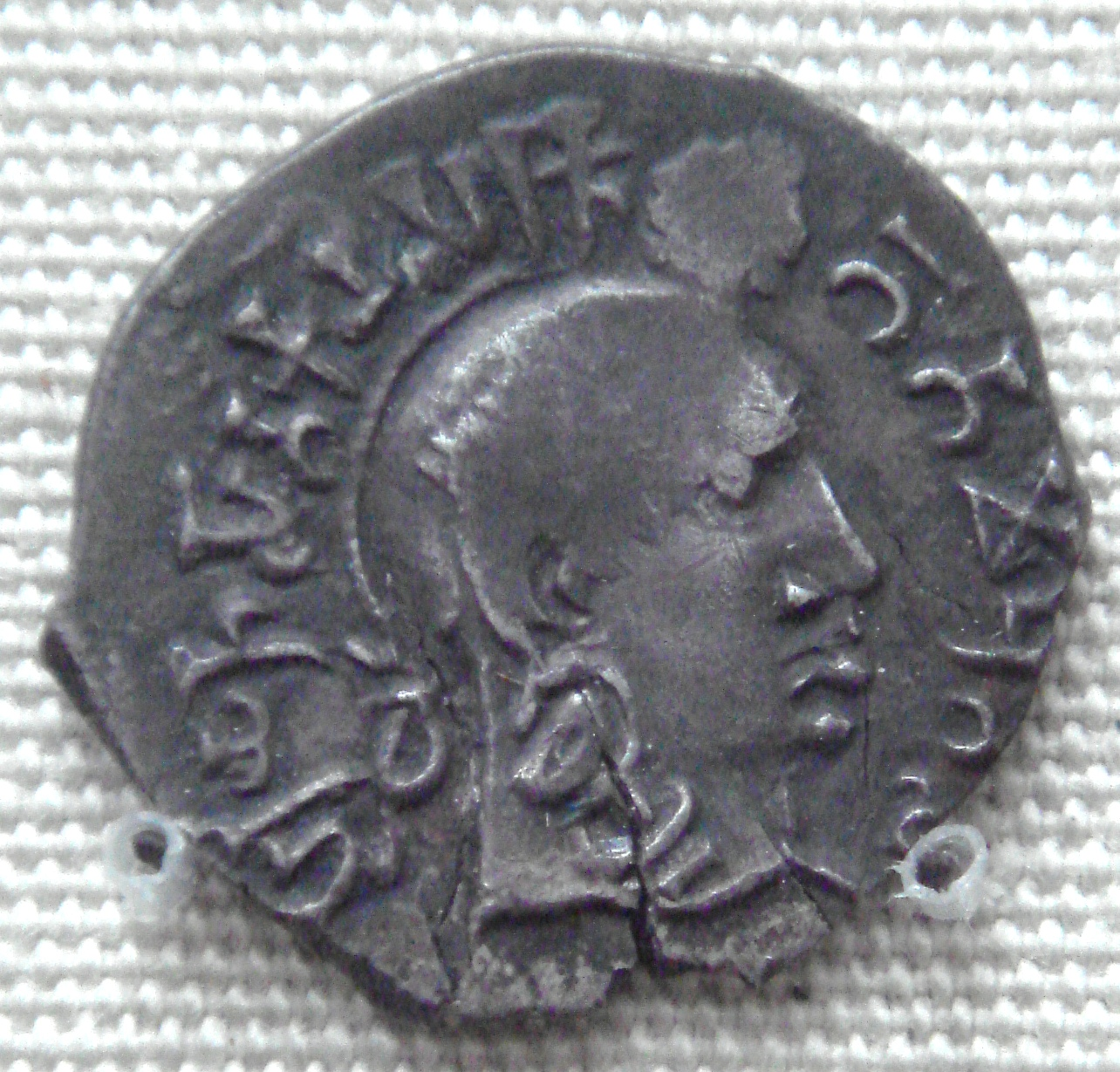
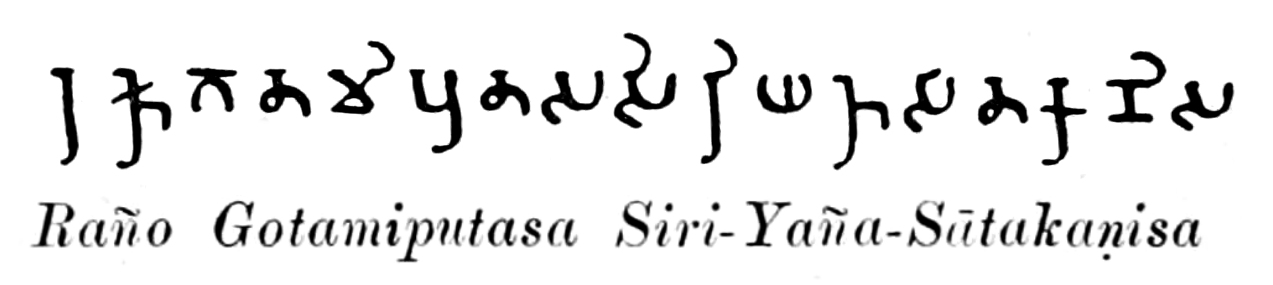
- Coin of Yajna Sri Satakarni, with coin legend in the Brahmi script (starting at 12 o'clock). British Museum

Last Satavahana King
- Reign: 2nd century CE
- Predecessor: Vashishtiputra Satakarni
- Successor: Madhariputra Sakasena
- Dynasty: Satvahana

Yajna Sri Satakarni, also known as Gautamiputra Yajna Sri, was an Indian ruler of the Satavahana dynasty. He was the brother of Vashishtiputra Satakarni. His reign is dated variously: c. 152-181 CE, c. 165-195 CE, c. 170-199 CE or c. 174-203.

He is considered to be the last great king of the Satavahana dynasty. He regained some of the territory lost to Shakas (the Western Satraps) under Vashishtiputra Satakarni. He defeated the Western Satraps and reconquered their southern regions in western and central India. The Satavahana started to decline after Yajna Sri Satakarni, while the Western Satraps would continue to prosper for another two centuries.

== Coinage ==
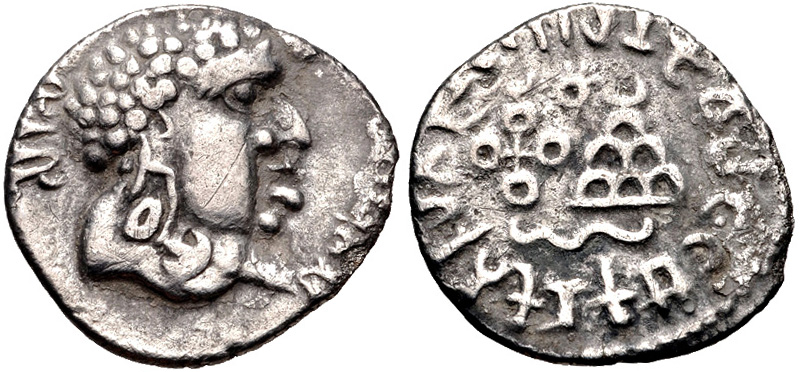
Coin of Gautamiputra Yajna Satakarni

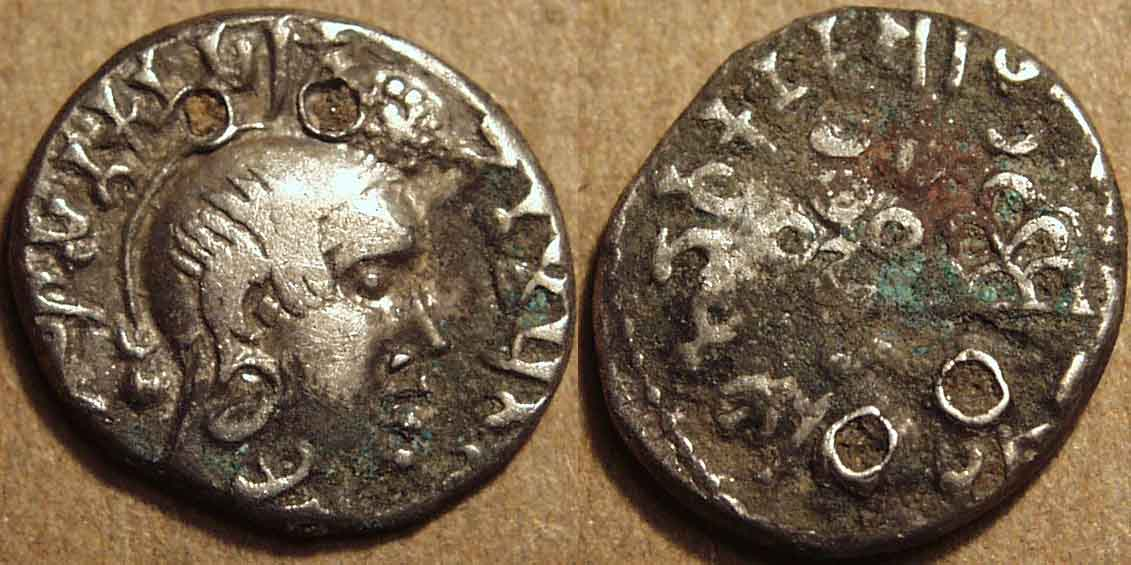
Coin of Gautamiputra Yajna Satakarni

== Inscriptions ==
There are two inscriptions of Yajna Sri Satakarni at Kanheri, in cave No.81, and in the Chaitya cave No.3.

In Nasik Caves, Cave No.20 has one large inscription, claiming that the unfinished cave was completed by the wife of a great general named Bhavagopa, during the 7th year of the rule of king Sri Yajna Satakarni, son of Gotami, after having been started by the ascetic Bopaki.

These inscriptions show that the Satavahanas were in possession of the areas of Kanheri and Nasik during the reign of Sri Yajna Satakarni.

He is also known from his coins, and from the mention of his name in the regnal lists of the Matsya Purana, in which he is said to have ruled 29 years.

Nasik Caves, Cave No.20 "Sri Yajna vihara" (circa 180 CE)

Cave No.20 at the Nasik Caves has one large inscription, claiming that the unfinished cave was completed by the wife of a great general named Bhavagopa, during the 7th year of the rule of king Sri Yajna Satakarni, son of Gotami, after having been started by the ascetic Bopaki. There are similar inscriptions of Sri Yajna Satakarni in cave 3 and cave 81 at Kanheri. This means probably that the cave was carved in the end of the 2nd century CE. It also shows that the Satavahanas reclaimed the area of Nasik under Sri Yajna Satakarni.
One more inscription over one of the small cellars mentions its gift by a lay devotee named Mamma.

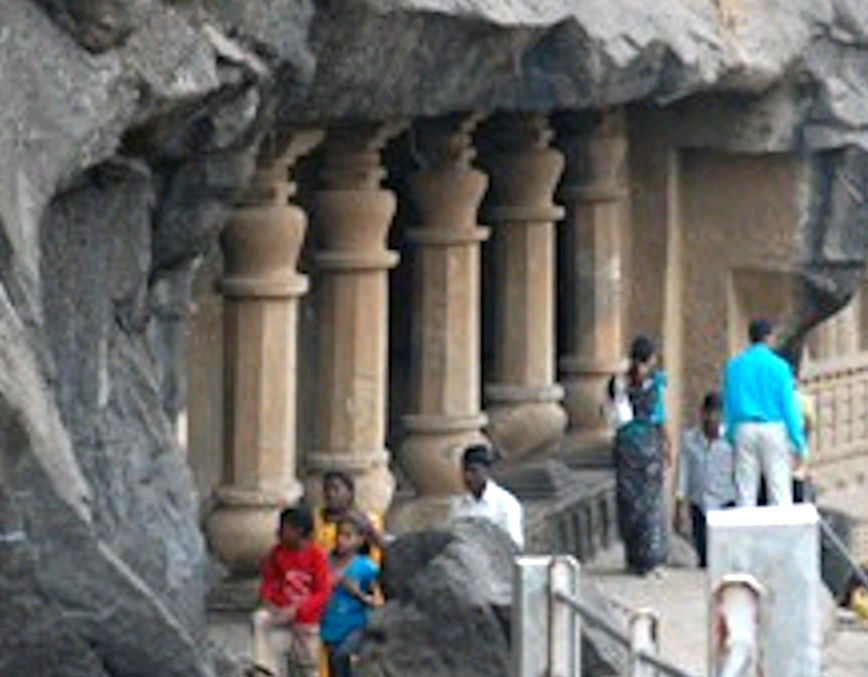
Exterior

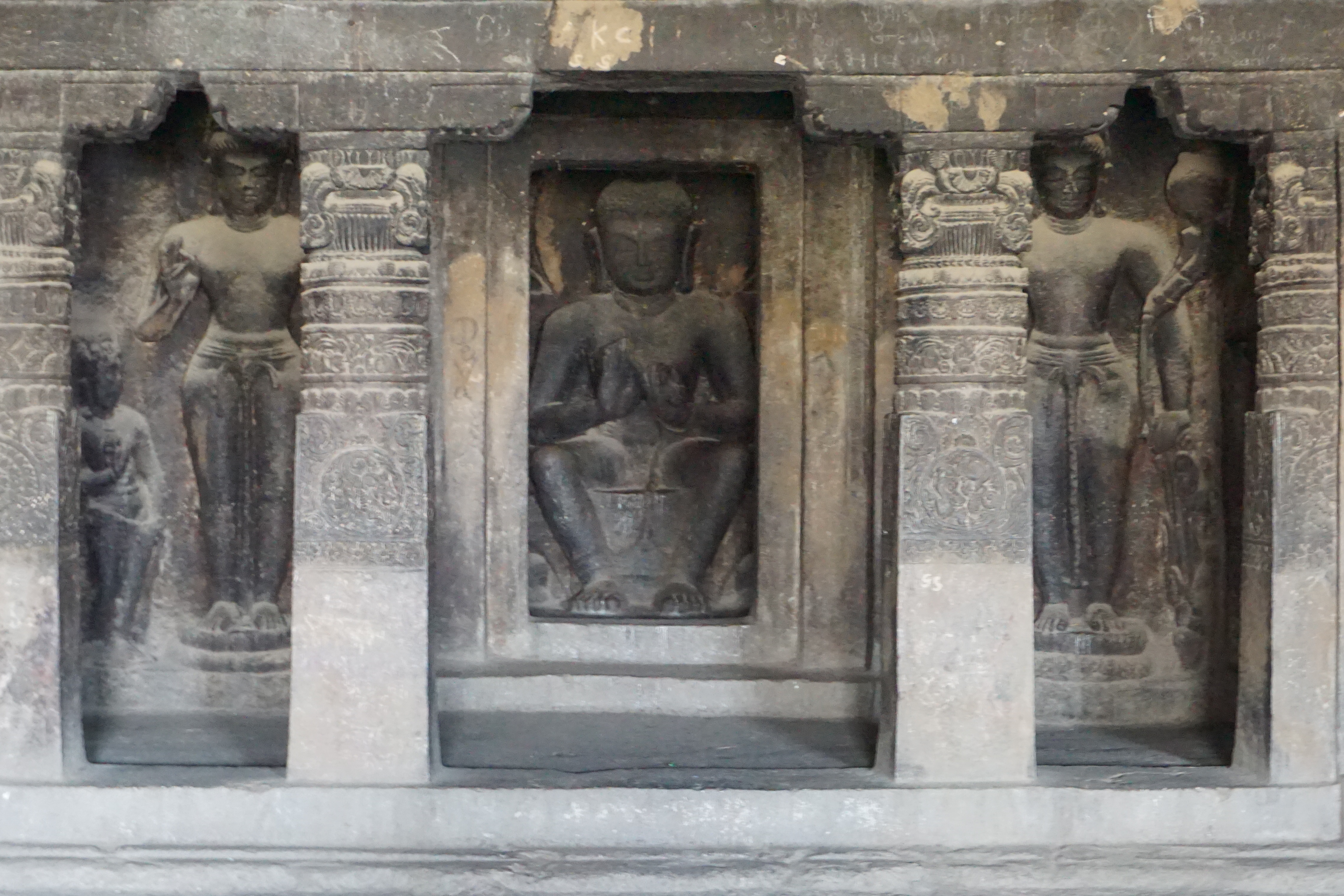
Interior reliefs with Buddha and Bodhisattvas

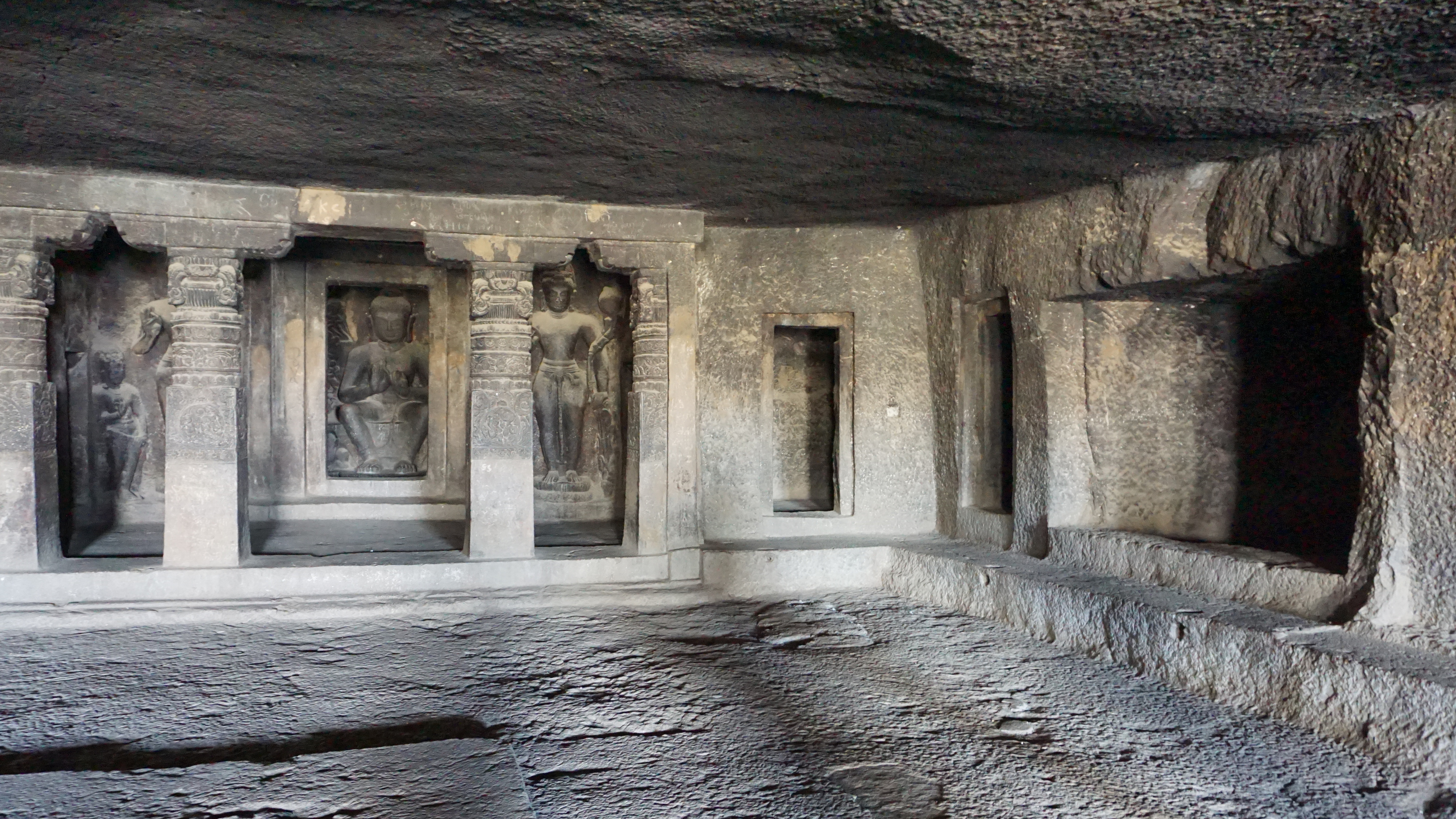
Interior

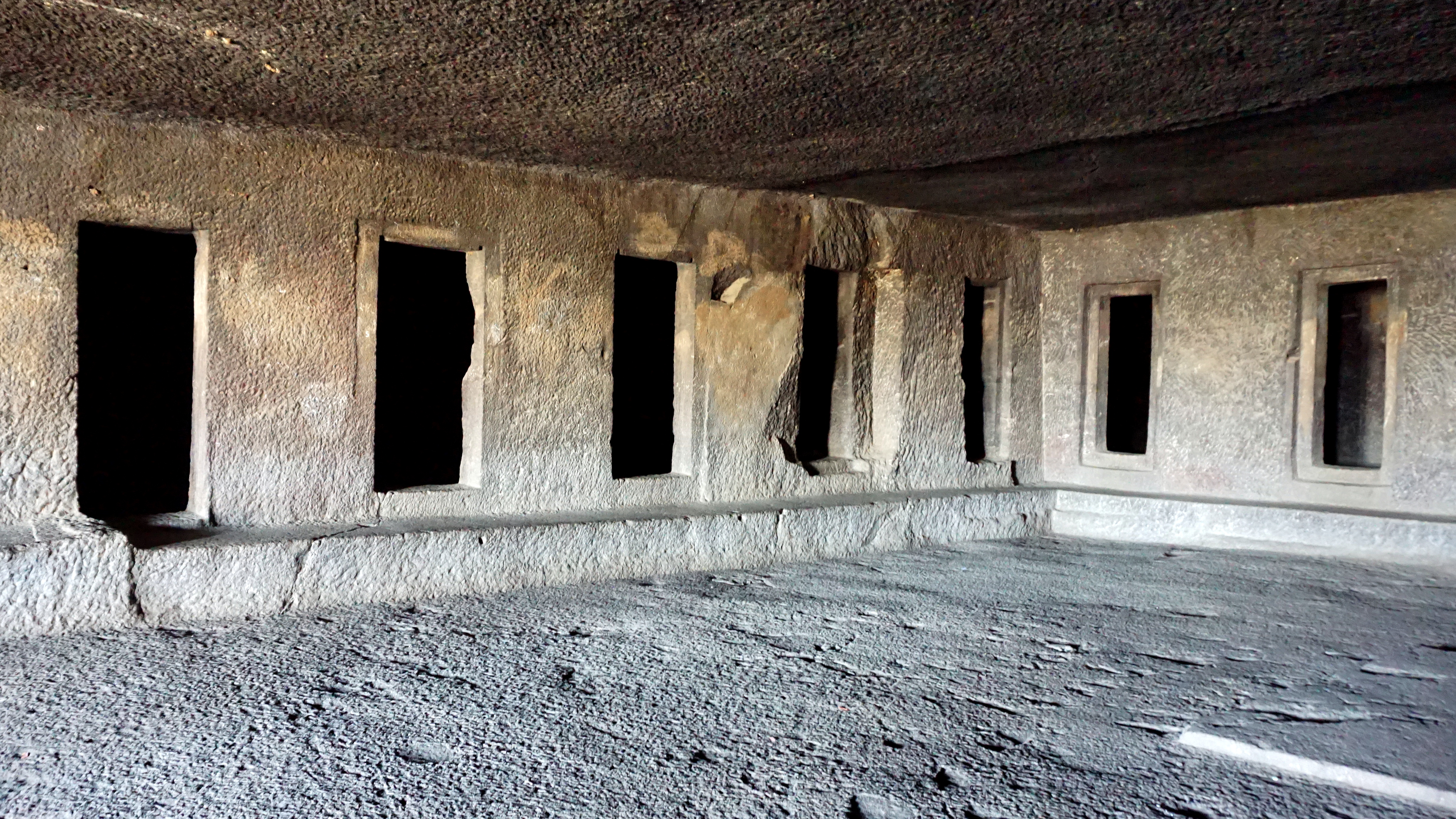
Interior cells

== Book sources ==
Rao (1994), History and Culture Of Andhra Pradesh: From the Earliest times to the present day, Sterling Publishers, ISBN 81-207-1719-8
