= List of Indo-Scythian dynasties and rulers =

The Indo-Scythians or Indo-Sakas were a branch of Saka in South Asia, a group of nomadic Iranian origin who migrated from Central Asia southward into the northwestern Indian subcontinent. They started expansion in South Asia from 200 to 100 BCE and established rule between 100 and 80 BCE, their rule in Indian subcontinent was lasted until 415s CE.

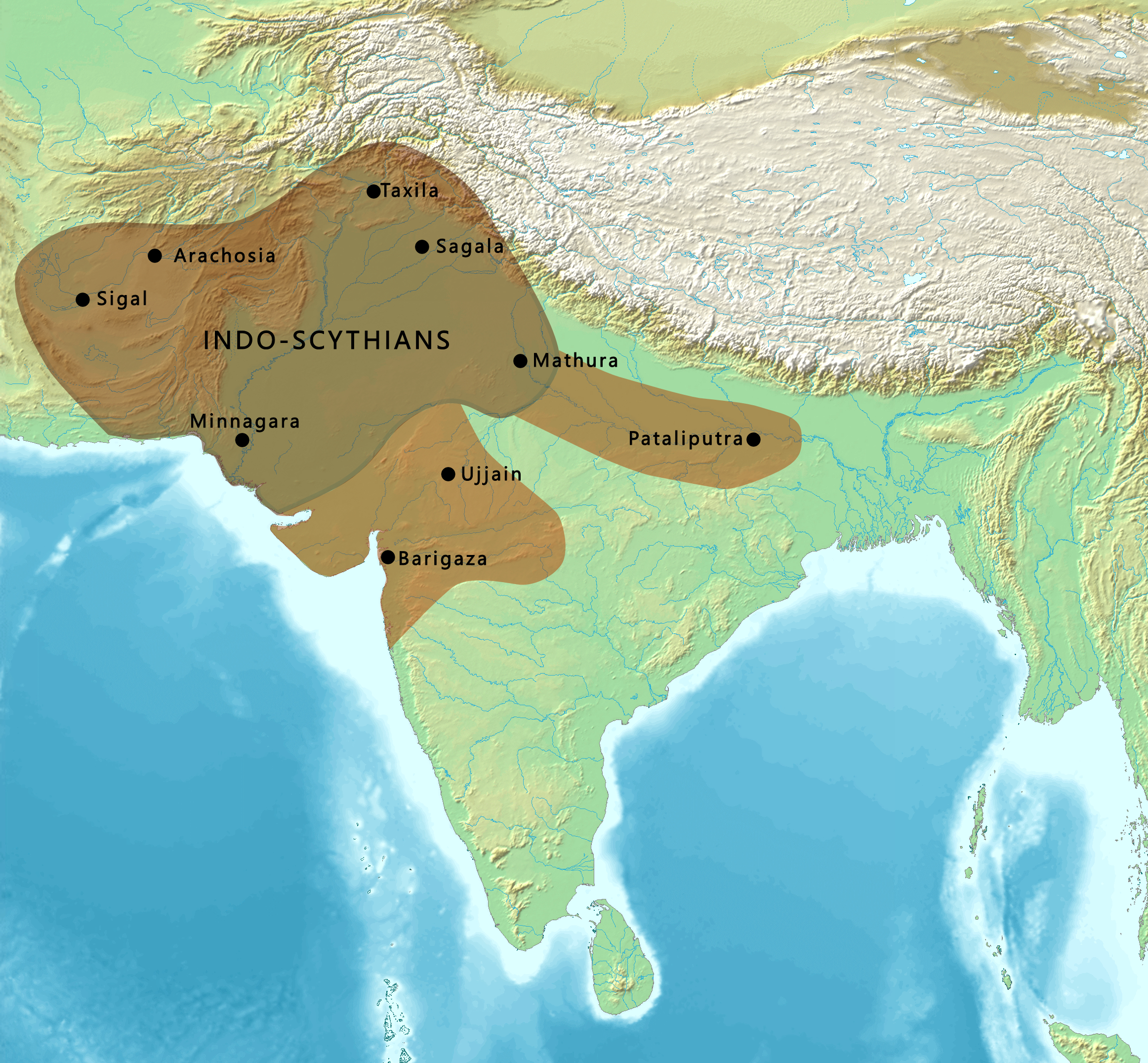
Territory of Indo-Scythians

The first known Saka king of India was Maues/Moga (1st century BCE) who established Saka power in Gandhara. The Indo-Scythians extended their supremacy over north-western subcontinent, conquering the Indo-Greeks and other local kingdoms. The Indo-Scythians were apparently subjugated by the Kushan Empire, by either Kujula Kadphises or Kanishka. Yet the Saka continued to govern as satrapies, forming the Northern Satraps and Western Satraps. The power of the Saka rulers started to decline in the 2nd century CE after the Indo-Scythians were defeated by the Satavahana emperor Gautamiputra Satakarni. Indo-Scythian rule in the northwestern subcontinent ceased when the last Western Satrap Rudrasimha IIII was defeated by the Gupta emperor Chandragupta II in 395 CE. Later Western Saka rulers (c. 396 to 415 CE) were conquered by Imperial Gupta Empire and it brought to end of Saka rule in Indian subcontinent.

== List of dynasties and rulers ==
=== Satraps dynasty of Gandhara (c. 85 BCE – 50 CE) ===
This branch of Indo-Scythian ruled over regions of Khyber-Pakhtunkhwa, Pakistan, and Eastern Afghanistan which constituted the Gandhara region.

List of rulers–

- Maues, (c. 85–60 BCE)
- Vonones, (c. 75–65 BCE)
- Spalahores, (c. 75–65 BCE), brother of King Vonones and probably the later King Spalirises
- Spalagadames, (c. 60–57 BCE), son of Spalahores
- Spalirises (c. 57–47 BCE), brother of King Vonones
- Azes I (c. 47–25 BCE), descended from Maues
- Azilises, (c. 25–20 BCE)
- Azes II, (c. 35-12 BCE)
- Zeionises, (c. 10 BCE–10 CE)
- Kharahostes, (c. 10 BCE–10 CE)
- Hajatria (c. until 40/50 CE)

=== Northern Satraps dynasty (c. 60 BCE – 130 CE) ===
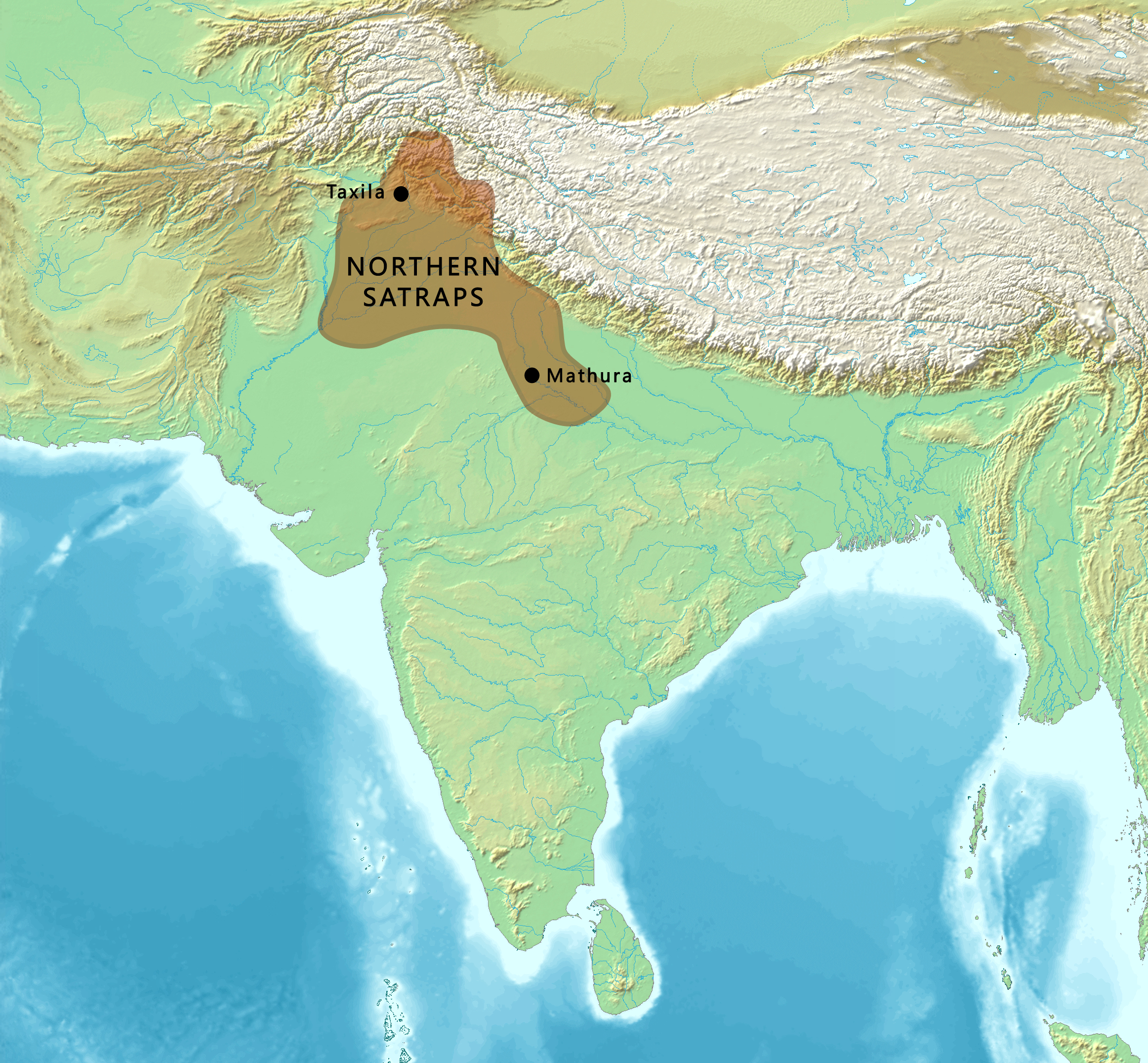
Territory of Northern Satraps

List of rulers–

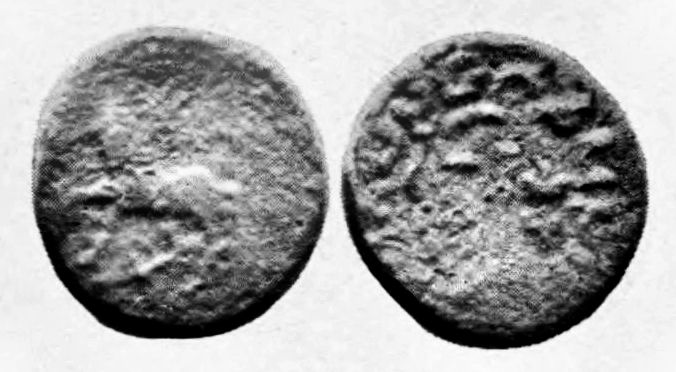
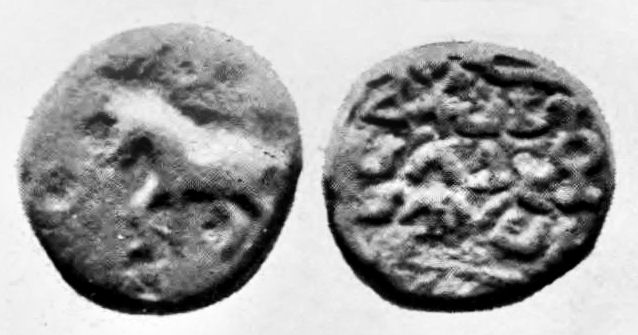
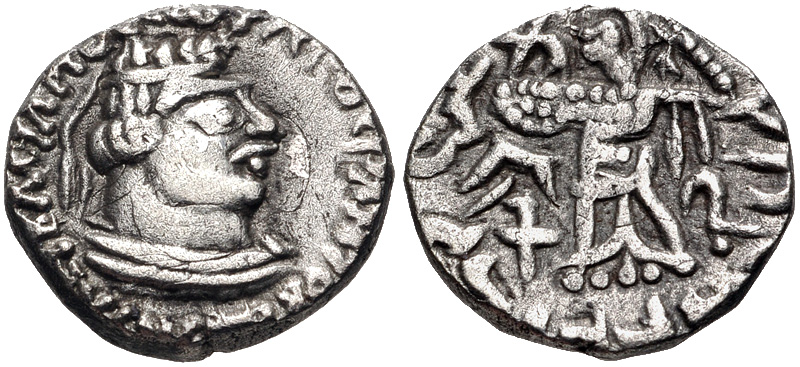
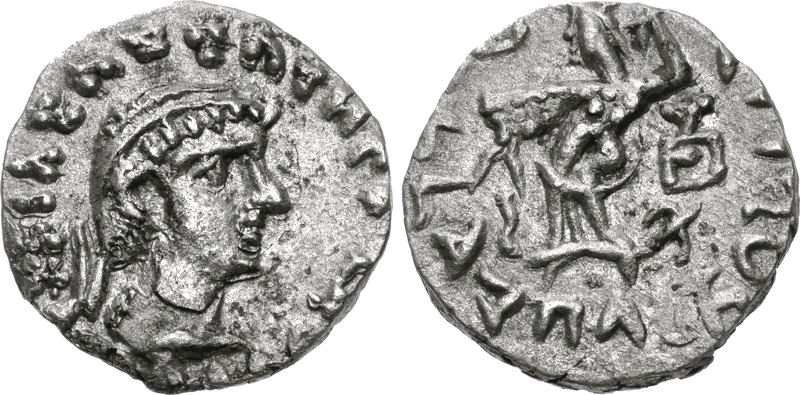
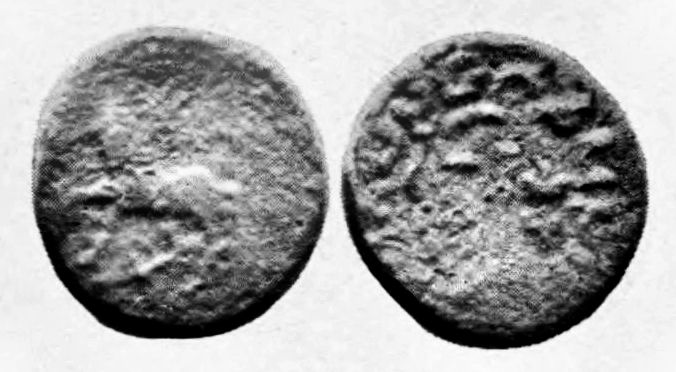
Ruler	Image	Title	Approx. dates	Mentions
Hagamasha		Satrap	1st century BCE	In the archaeological excavations of Sonkh, near Mathura, the earliest coins of the Kshatrapa levels were those of Hagamasha.
Hagana		Satrap	1st century BCE
Rajuvula		Great Satrap	early 1st century BCE
Bhadayasa		Satrap	1st century CE	Possible successor of Rajuvula in Eastern Punjab
Sodasa		Satrap	1st century CE	Son of Rajuvula in Mathura
Kharapallana	Ksatrapena Vanasparena Kharapallanena	Great Satrap	c. CE 130	Great Satrap for Kushan ruler Kanishka I
Vanaspara	Ksatrapena Vanasparena Kharapallanena	Satrap	c. CE 130	Satrap for Kushan ruler Kanishka I

=== Western Satraps dynasty (c. 50 BCE – 415 CE) ===
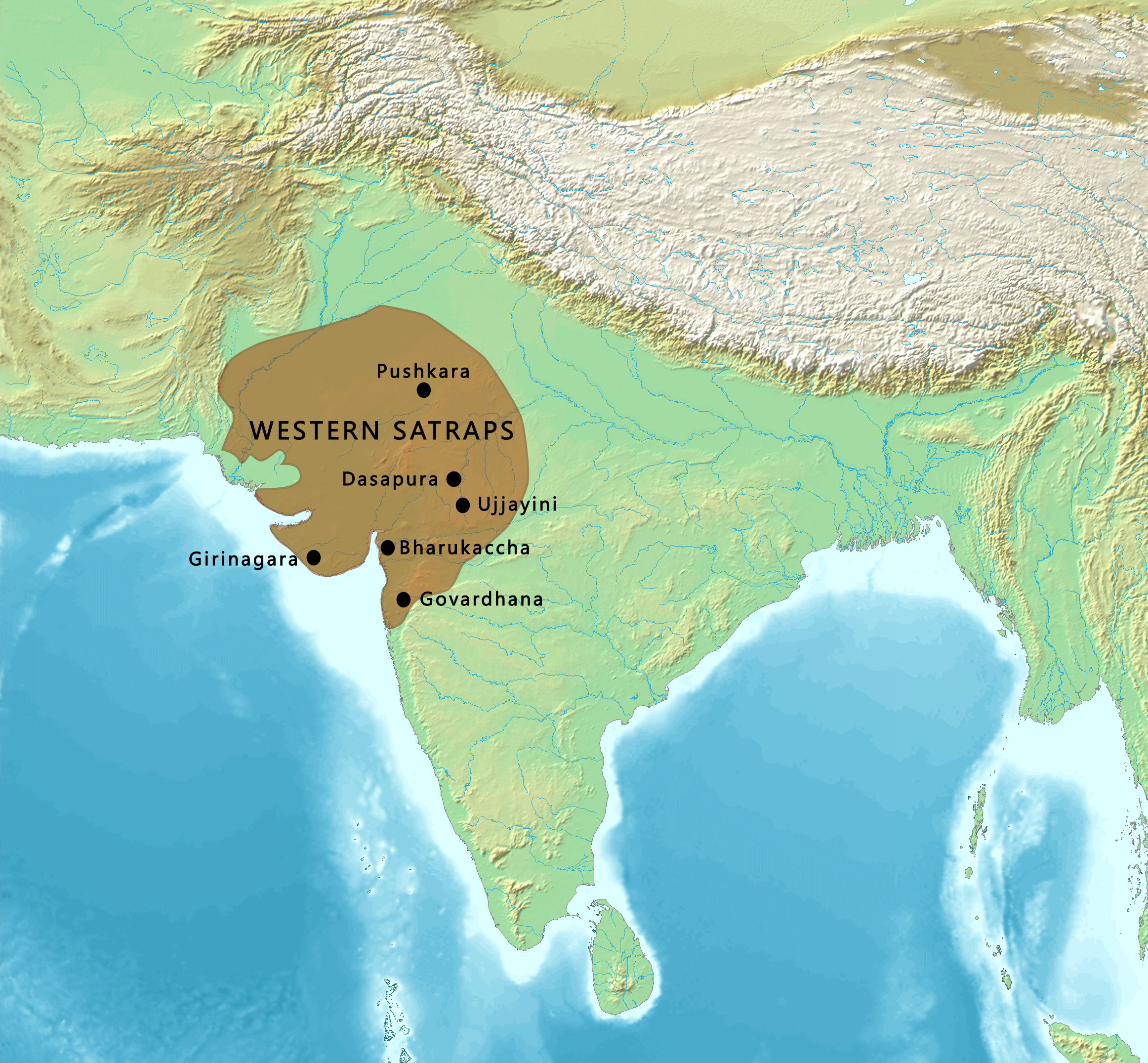
Territory of Western Satraps

Family tree–

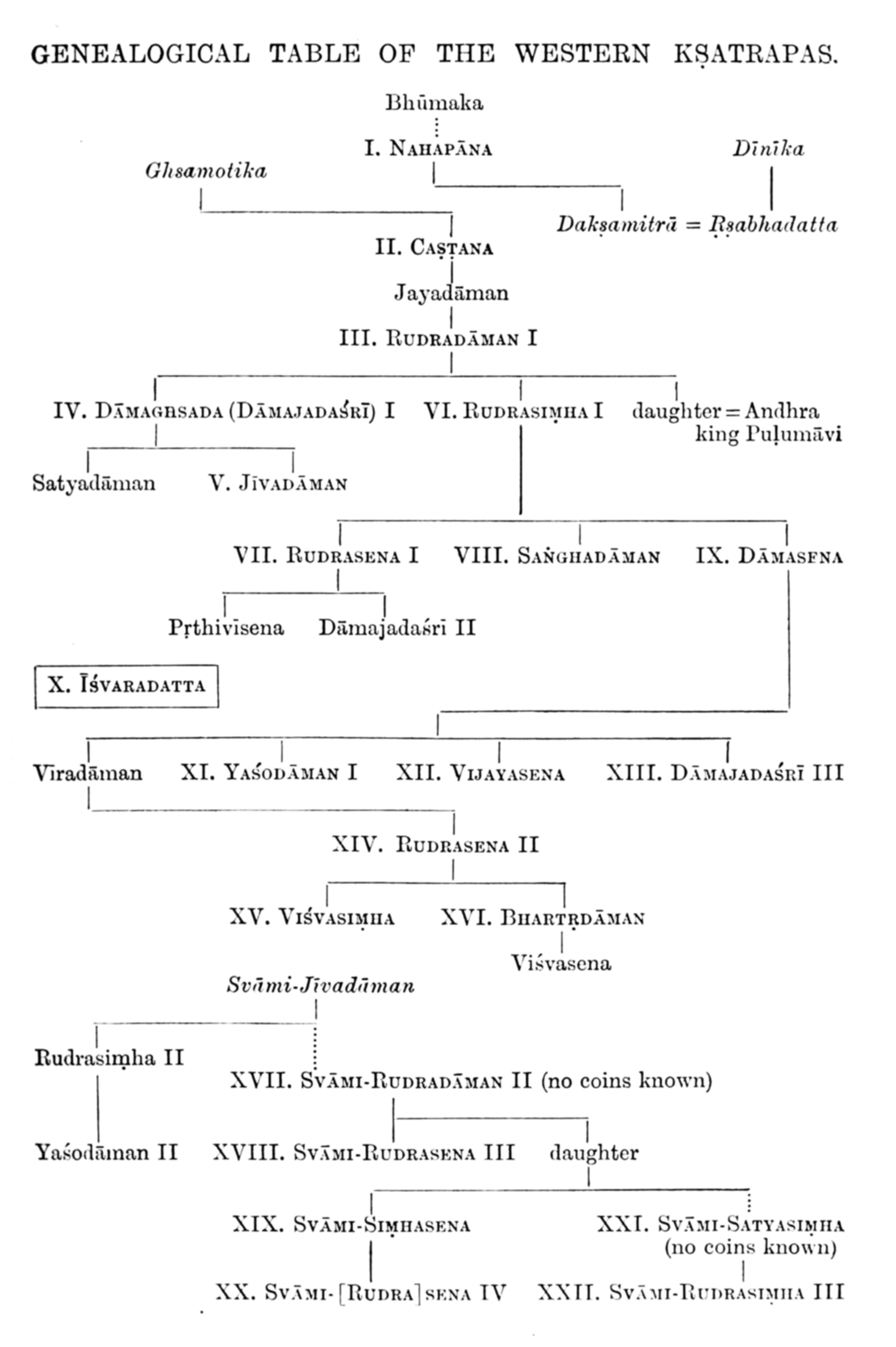
Genealogical table of the Western Satraps

==== Kshaharata dynasty (c. 1st century BCE to 1st century CE) ====
This branch of Indo-Scythian ruled over regions of Khyber-Pakhtunkhwa, Punjab and beyond.

List of rulers–

- Liaka Kusuluka, satrap of Chuksa
- Kusulaka Patika, satrap of Chuksa and son of Liaka Kusulaka
- Yapirajaya
- Hospises
- Higaraka
- Abhiraka (Aubhirakes)

==== Kardamaka (Bhadramukhas) dynasty ====
List of rulers–

- Abhiraka (Aubhirakes)
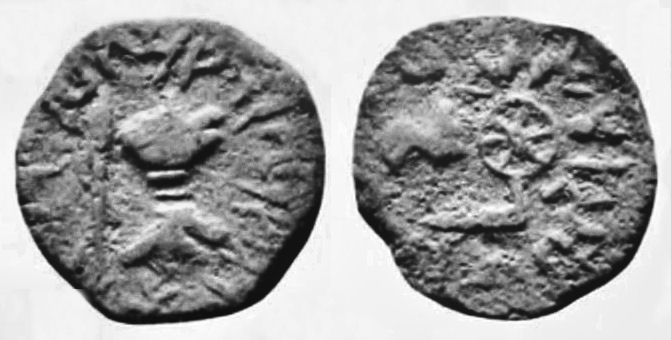
- Bhumaka
- Nahapana (c. r. between 24 and 78 CE)

(main founder of the Western Satraps)

- Viceroy Ushavadata

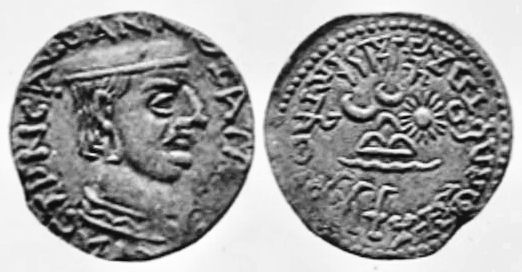
- Chastana (78–130) , son of Ysāmotika
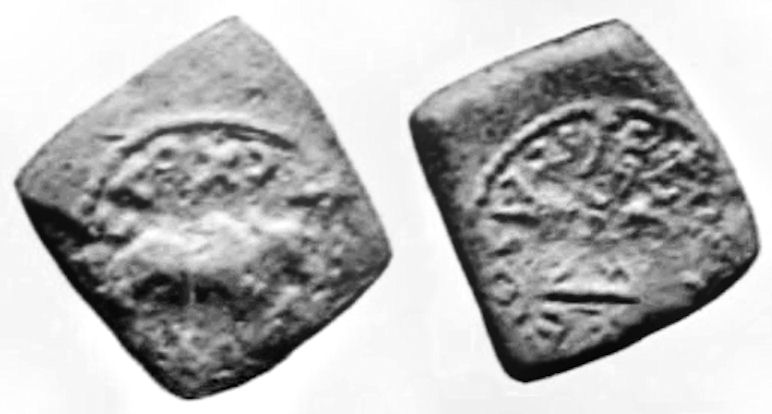
- Jayadaman, son of Chastana
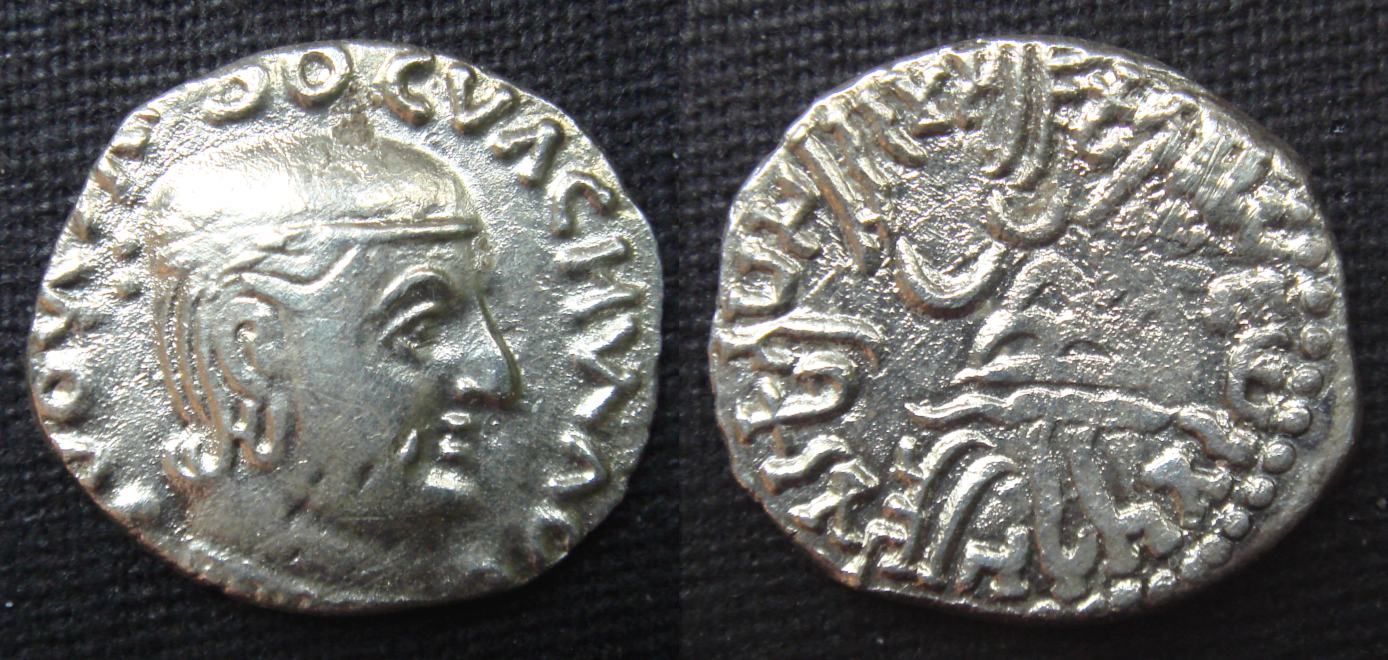
- Rudradaman I (130–150) , son of Jayadaman
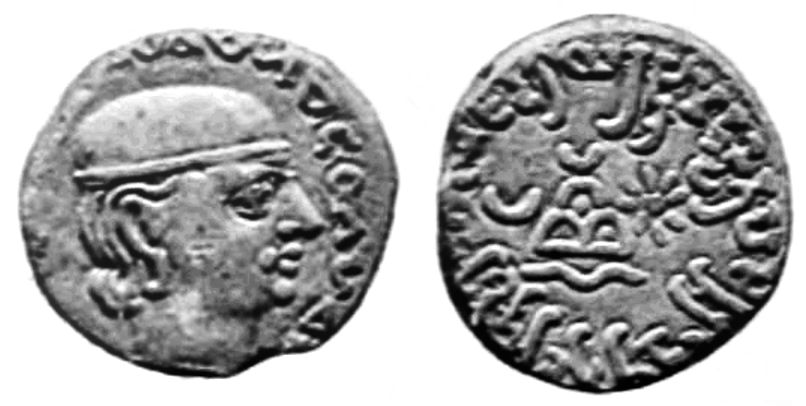
- Damajadasri I (170–175)
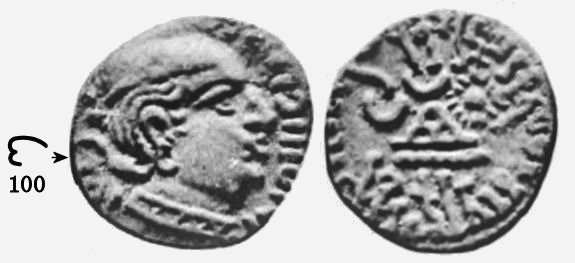
- Jivadaman (178-181, d. 199)
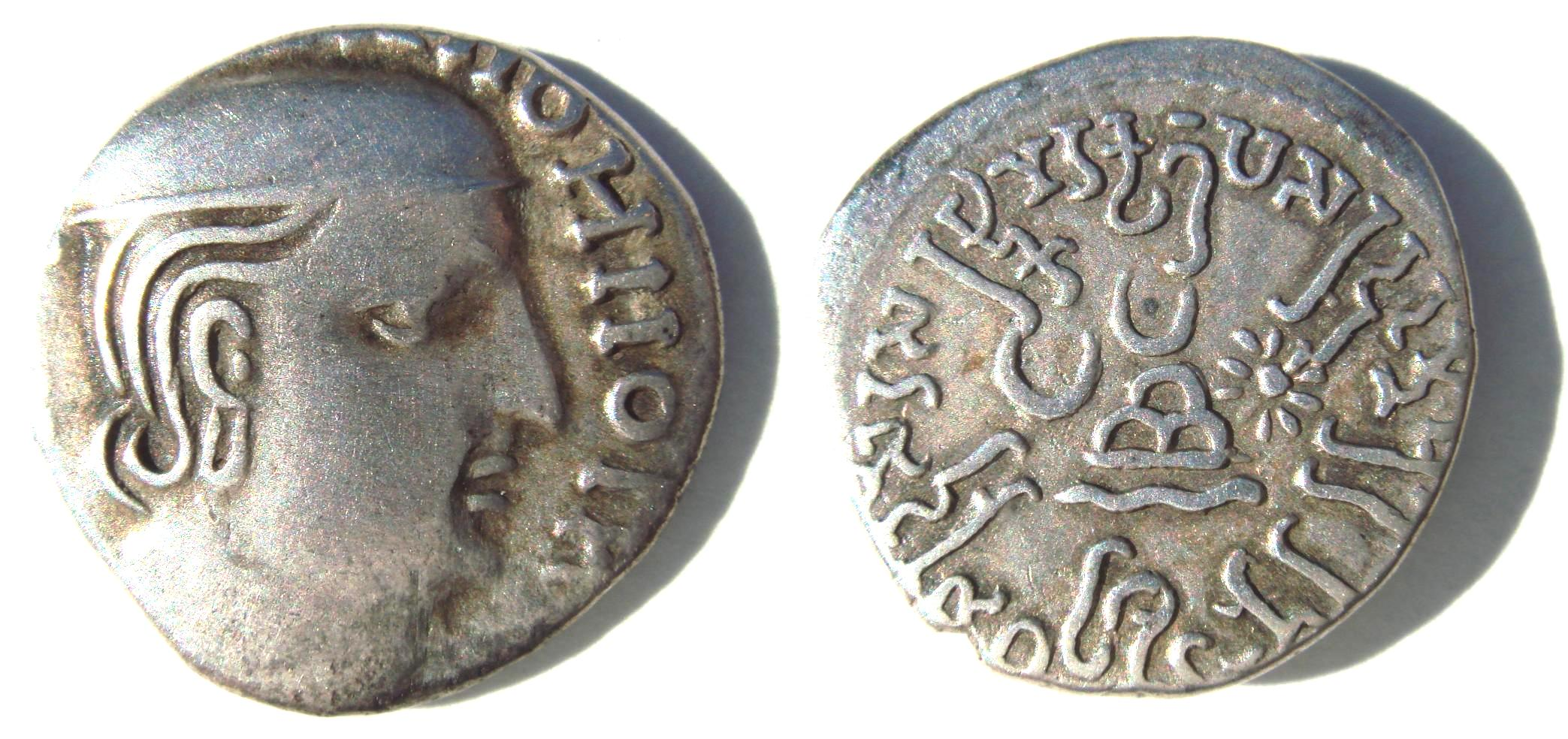
- Rudrasimha I (180–188, d. 197)
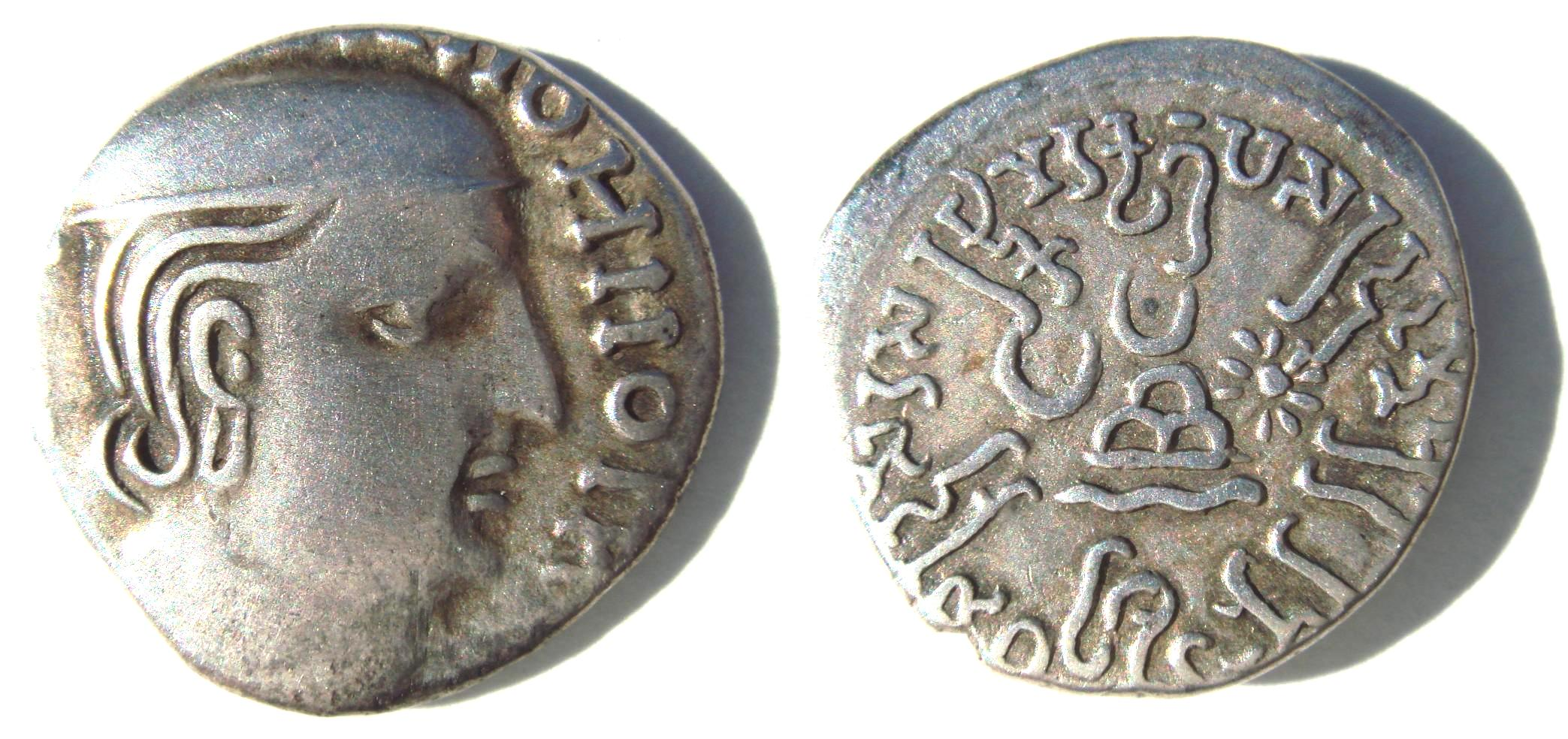
- Rudrasimha I (restored) (191–197)
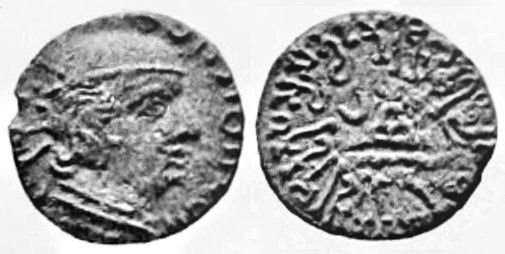
- Satyadaman (197-198)
- Jivadaman (restored) (197–199)
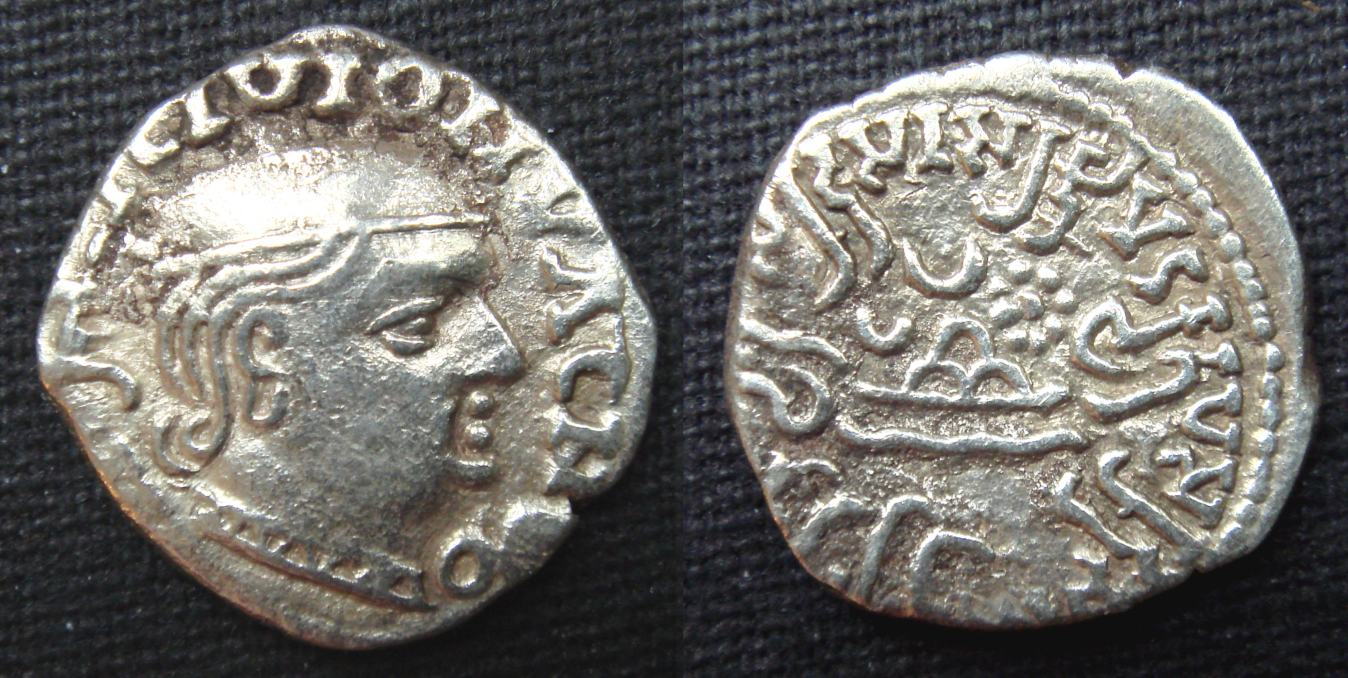
- Rudrasena I (200–222)
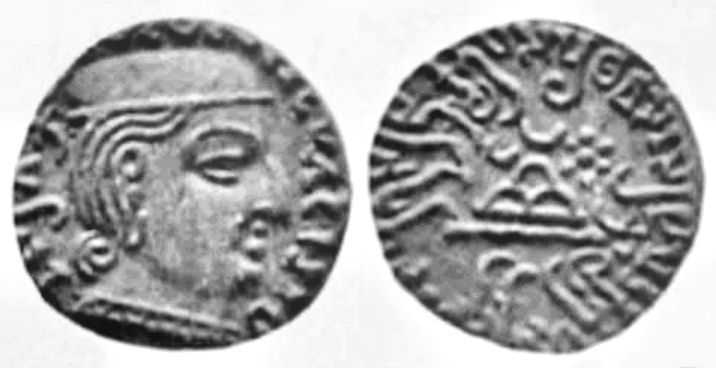
- Prthivisena (222)
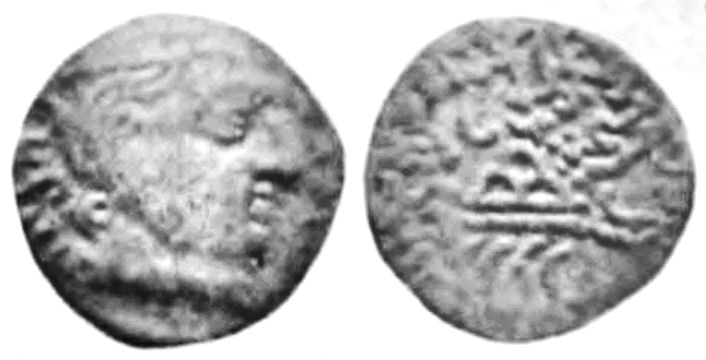
- Samghadaman (222–223)
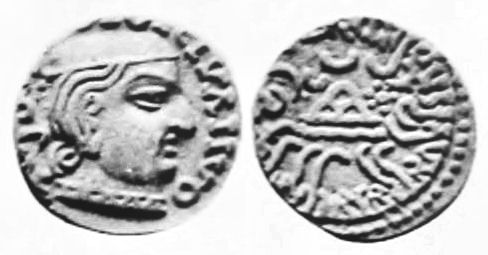
- Damasena (223–232)
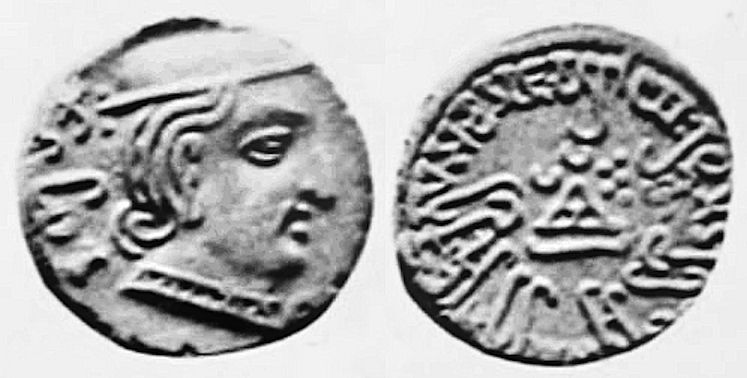
- Damajadasri II (232–239) with
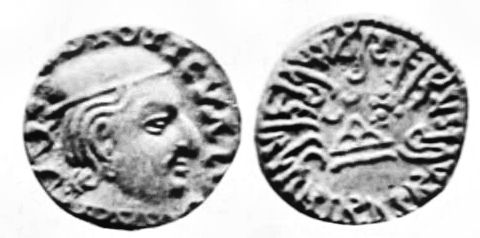
- Viradaman (234–238)
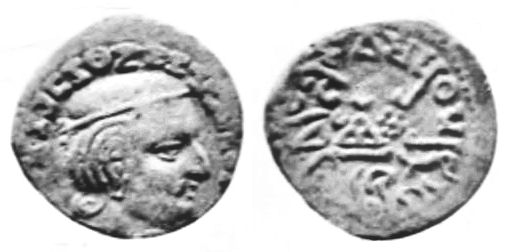
- Isvaradatta (236–239)
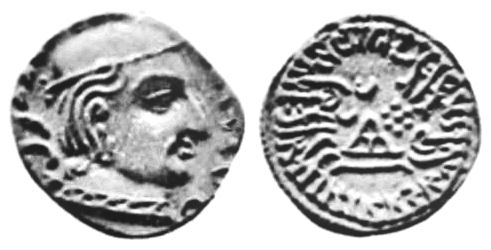
- Yasodaman I (239)
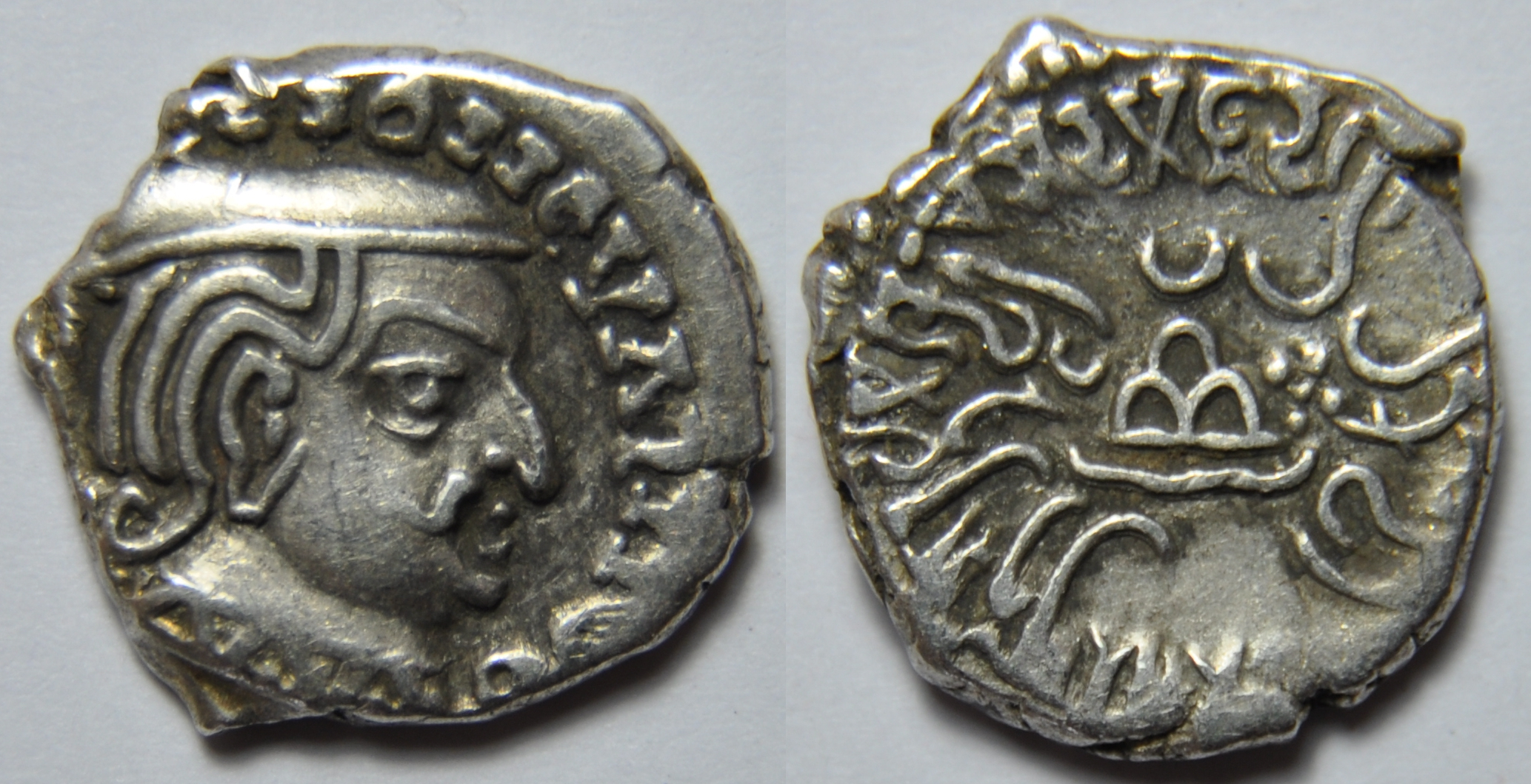
- Vijayasena (239–250)
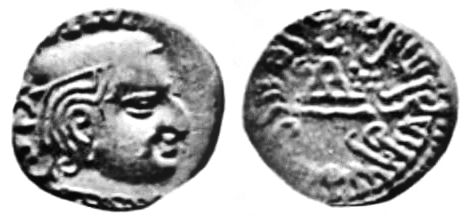
- Damajadasri III (251–255)
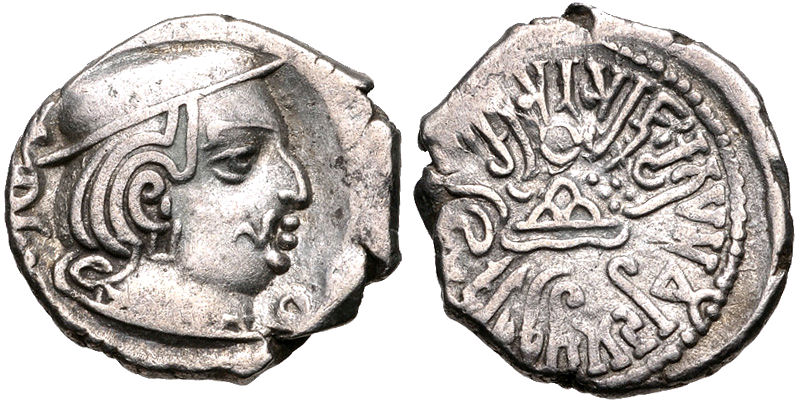
- Rudrasena II (255–277)
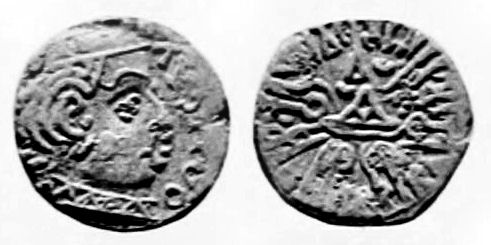
- Visvasimha (277–282)
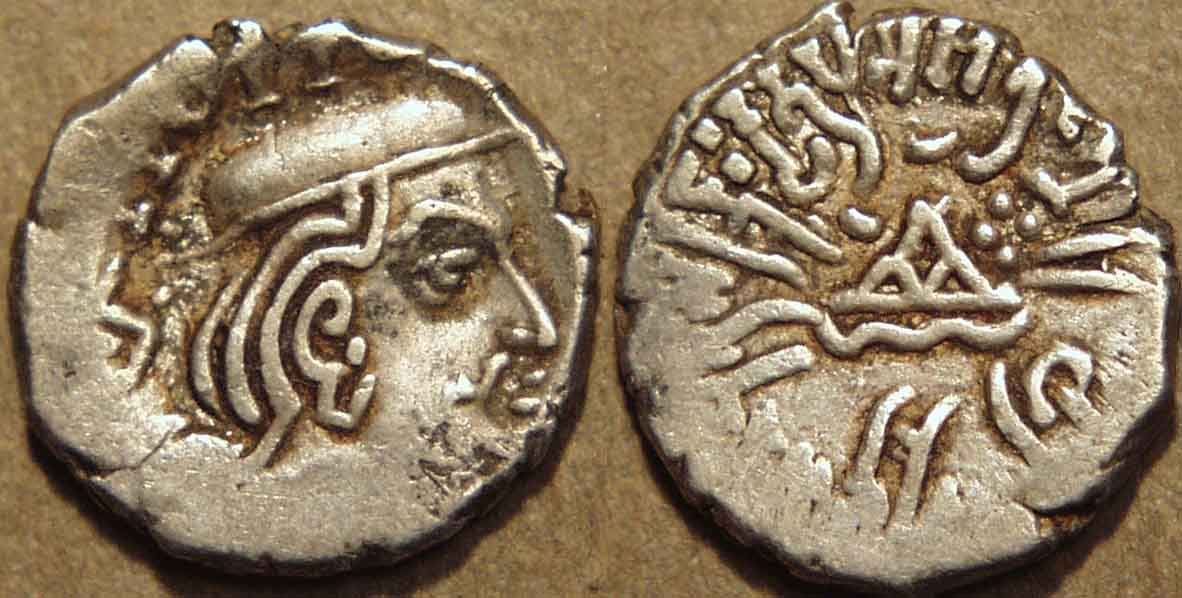
- Bhartrdaman (282–295)
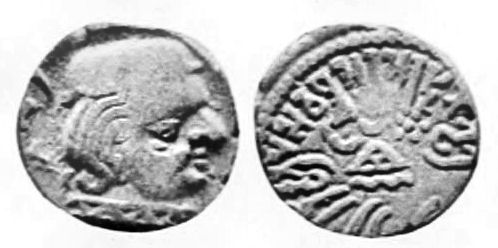
- Visvasena (293–304)

==== Rudrasimha II dynasty (c. 304 – 415 CE) ====
List of rulers–

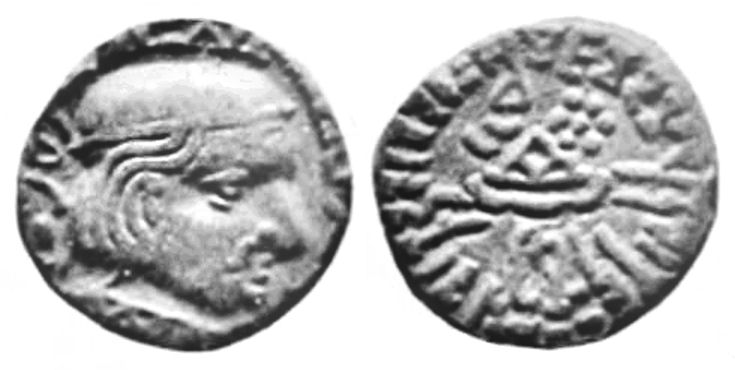
- Rudrasimha II (304–348) , son of Lord (Svami) Jivadaman, with

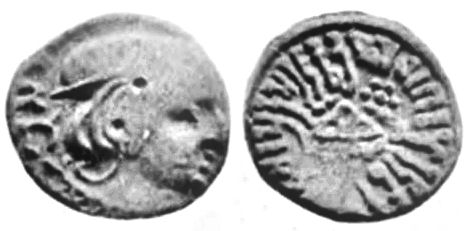
- Yasodaman II (317–332)
- Rudradaman II (332–348) No coins known

- (Sridharavarman (339-368) No coins known
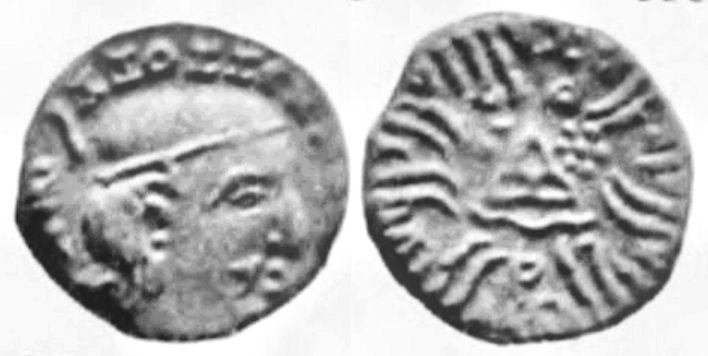
- Rudrasena III (348–380)
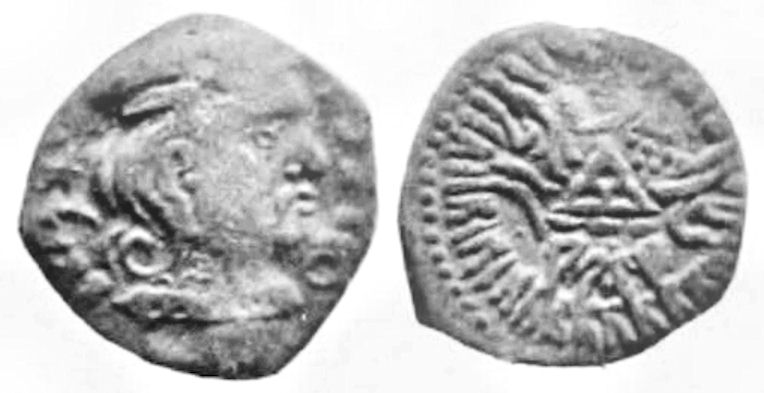
- Simhasena (380–384/5)
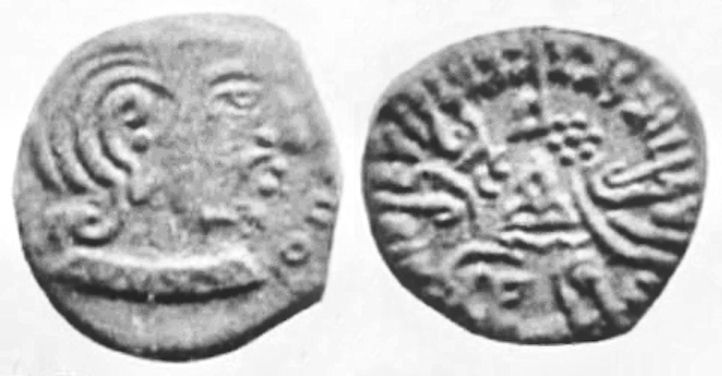
- Rudrasena IV (382–388)
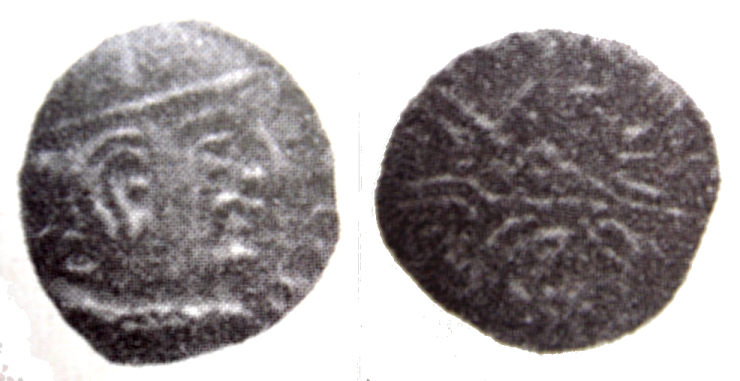
- Rudrasimha III (388–415)

=== Minor local rulers ===
- Bhadayasa
- Mamvadi
- Arsakes

== See also ==
- Middle kingdoms of India
- List of Indian monarchs
