= Maha-kshtrapa =

Title in medieval Gujarat

Maha-kshtrapa was a title meaning "Great Satrap" in early medieval Gujarat. As satraps (kshtrapas) of the failing Scythian Empire, some leaders in western India elevated their titles to Great Satrap when they became increasingly independent of imperial rule.

The Maha-kshtrapa Rudradaman I oversaw extensive canal repairs in Gujarat which led to double cropping. He also led battles against his neighbors which increased his property. In his propaganda, Rudradaman was praised as an upholder of dharma, a fine swordsman and boxer, an excellent horseman and elephant rider, a charioteer, a famous scholar of grammar and music, a logical thinker, and a generous king. The memorial praising Rudradaman is the earliest known classical Sanskrit inscription of any extent.
