= Rudrasimha I =

Western Kshatrapa ruler from 178 to 197

- Western Satrap
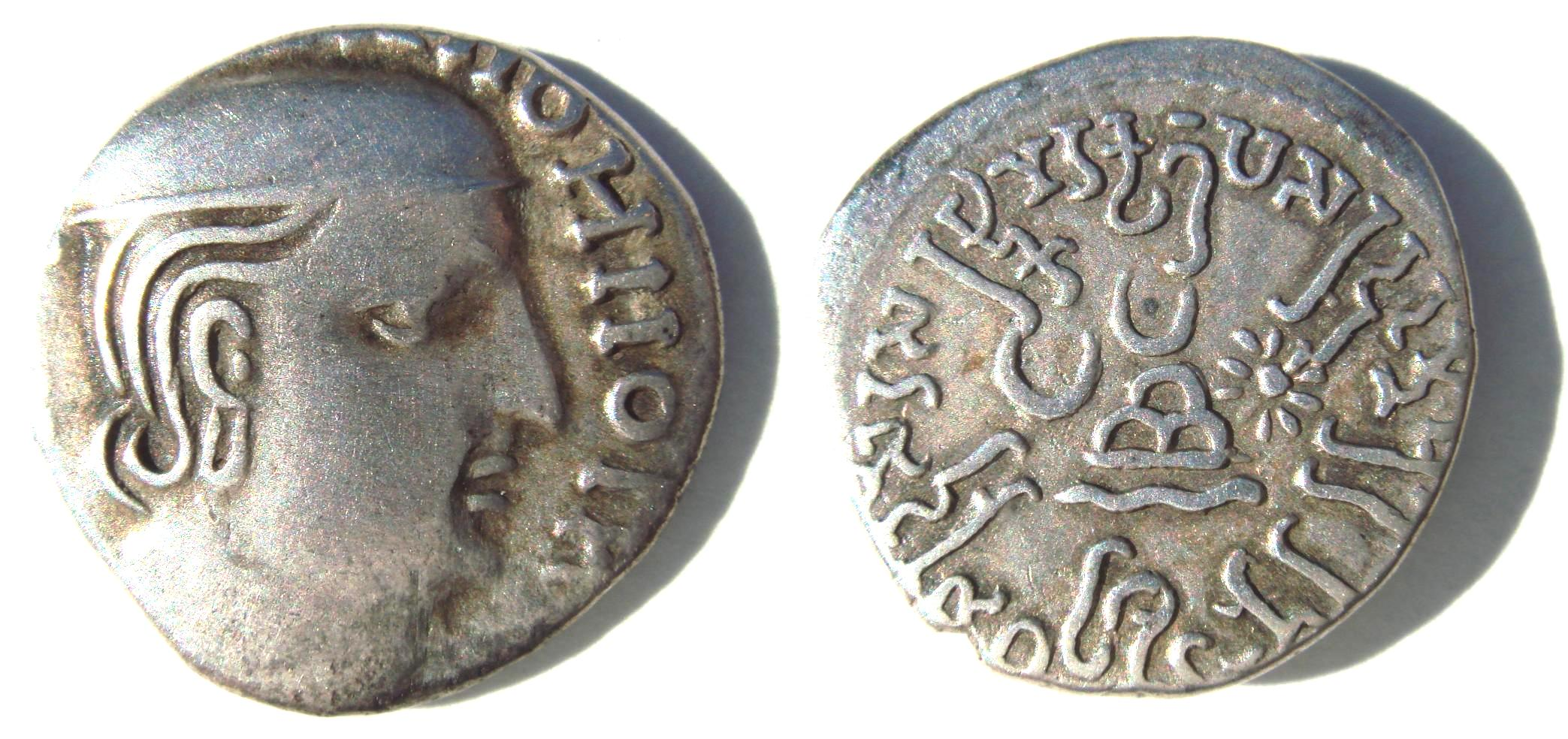
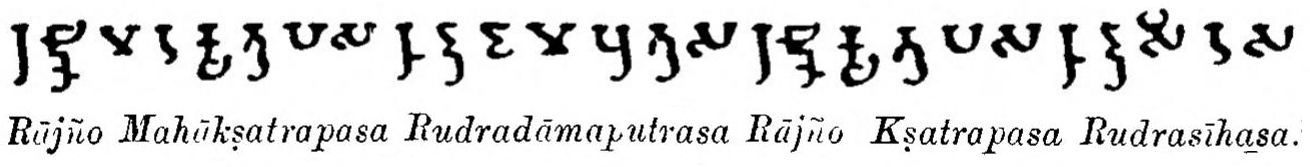
- Coin of the Western Kshatrapa ruler Rudrasimha I (178 to 197). Obv: Bust of Rudrasimha, with corrupted Greek legend "..OHIIOIH.." (Indo-Greek style). Rev: Three-arched hill or Chaitya, with river, crescent and sun, within Prakrit legend in Brahmi script (from 10 o'clock): Rudrasimha I, Brahmi legend on coinage Rajno Mahaksatrapasa Rudradamnaputrasa Rajna Mahaksatrapasa Rudrasihasa "King and Great Satrap Rudrasimha, son of King and Great Satrap Rudradaman".

Western Kshatrapa ruler
- Reign: 178–197 CE
- Predecessor: Jivadaman
- Successor: Satyadaman
- Issue: Rudrasena I

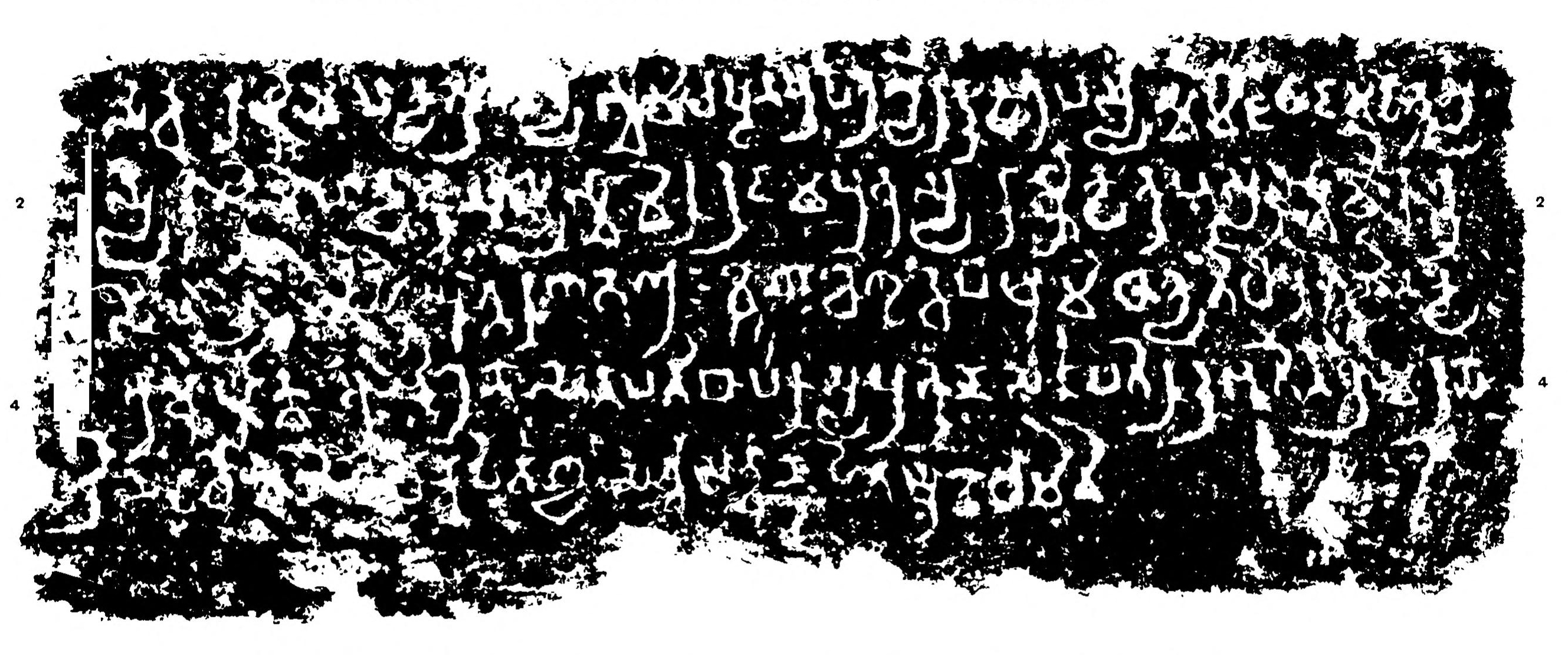
Gunda inscription of Rudrasimha, Saka year 103.

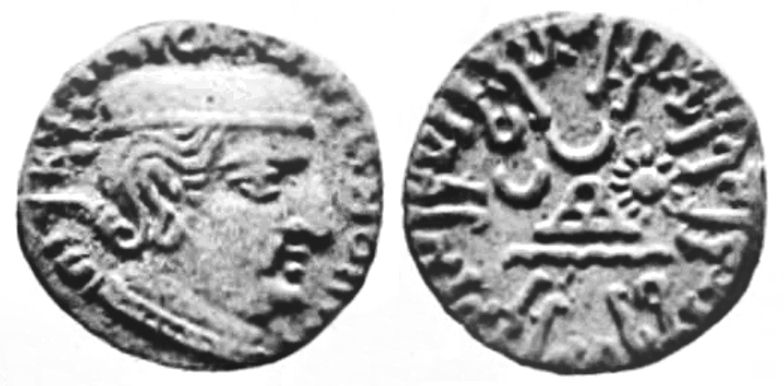
Coin of Rudrasimha I, dated 114 Saka Era (192 CE).

Rudrasimha I was a Western Kshatrapa ruler, who reigned from 178 to 197 CE. He was son of Rudradaman I, grandson of Jayadaman, and grand-grandson of Chashtana. During his reign, the Abhiras became increasingly important. Some of them were even serving as generals. Ashvini Agrawal thinks that the Abhira king Isvardatta was a general in the service of Rudrasimha I who deposed his master in 188 A.D and ascended the throne. Ashvini Agrawal further says that Rudrasimha I soon deposed him and regained the throne in 190 A.D.

== Reign ==
=== Numismatics and Epigraphics ===
From the reigns of Jivadaman and Rudrasimha I, the date of minting of each coin, reckoned in the Saka era, is usually written on the obverse behind the king's head in Brahmi numerals, allowing for a quite precise datation of the rule of each king. This is a rather uncommon case in Indian numismatics. Some, such as the numismat R.C Senior considered that these dates might correspond to the much earlier Azes era instead.

=== Influence of Abhiras ===
During his reign, the Abhiras became increasingly important. Some of them were even serving as generals. Ashvini Agrawal thinks that the Abhira king Isvardatta was a general in the service of Rudrasimha I who deposed his master in 188 A.D and ascended the throne. Ashvini Agrawal further says that Rudrasimha I soon deposed him and regained the throne in 190 A.D.

Rudrasimha I is also known for an inscription in Sanskrit at Gunda, north Kathiawar, mentioning "the digging of a well for the welfare of society by Senapati Bapaka's son, Rudrabhuti Abhira", and dated to Saka era 103 (181 CE). The inscription also gives a detailed genealogy of the kings up to Rudrasimha:

"Hail ! On the [auspicious] fifth tithi of the bright fortnight of Vaisakha during the auspicious period of the constellation of Rohini, in the year one hundred and three — 100 3 — (during the reign) of the king, the Kshatrapa Lord Rudrasiha (Rudrasimha), the son of the king, the Maha-Kshatrapa Lord Rudradaman (and) son’s son of the king, the Kshatrapa Lord Jayadaman, (and) grandson’s son of the king, the Maha-Kshatrapa Lord Chashtana, the well was caused to be dug and embanked by the general (senapati) Rudrabuthi, the son

of the general (senapati) Bapaka, the Abhira, at the village (grama) of Rasopadra, for the welfare and comfort of all living beings."

— Epigraphia Indica XVI, p.233

The inscription refers Rudrasimha to as simply a ksatrapa, ignoring the existence of any mahaksatrapa. According to Sudhakar Chattopadhyaya, this indicates that the Abhira general was the de facto ruler of the state, though not assuming any higher title. The inscription states Abhira Rudrabhuti as the son of the general Bapaka. The Abhira dynasty was probably related Abhira Rudrabhuti.

== Notes ==
Territories/ dates	Western India	Western Pakistan Balochistan	Paropamisadae Arachosia	Bajaur	Gandhara	Western Punjab	Eastern Punjab	Mathura
			INDO-GREEK KINGDOM					
90–85 BCE			Nicias	Menander II		Artemidoros		
90–70 BCE			Hermaeus	Archebius				
85-60 BCE			INDO-SCYTHIAN KINGDOM; Maues					
75–70 BCE			Vonones; Spalahores	Telephos		Apollodotus II		
65–55 BCE			Spalirises; Spalagadames			Hippostratos	Dionysios	
55–35 BCE			Azes I				Zoilos II	
55–35 BCE			Azilises; Azes II				Apollophanes	Indo-Scythian dynasty of the NORTHERN SATRAPS; Hagamasha
25 BCE – 10 CE				Indo-Scythian dynasty of the APRACHARAJAS; Vijayamitra (ruled 12 BCE - 15 CE) (Note: From the dated inscription on the Rukhana reliquary)	Liaka Kusulaka; Patika Kusulaka; Zeionises	Kharahostes (ruled 10 BCE– 10 CE) (Note: An Inscribed Silver Buddhist Reliquary of the Time of King Kharaosta and Prince Indravarman, Richard Salomon, Journal of the American Oriental Society, Vol. 116, No. 3 (Jul. - Sep., 1996), pp. 442); Mujatria	Strato II and Strato III	Hagana
10-20 CE		INDO-PARTHIAN KINGDOM; Gondophares		Indravasu	INDO-PARTHIAN KINGDOM; Gondophares		Rajuvula	
20-30 CE			Ubouzanes; Pakores	Vispavarma (ruled c.0-20 CE) (Note: A Kharosthī Reliquary Inscription of the Time of the Apraca Prince Visnuvarma, by Richard Salomon, South Asian Studies 11 1995, Pages 27-32, Published online: 09 Aug 2010)	Sarpedones		Bhadayasa	Sodasa
30-40 CE			KUSHAN EMPIRE; Kujula Kadphises	Indravarma	Abdagases		...	...
40-45 CE				Aspavarma	Gadana		...	...
45-50 CE				Sasan	Sases		...	...
50-75 CE							...	...
75-100 CE	Indo-Scythian dynasty of the WESTERN SATRAPS; Chastana		Vima Takto				...	...
100-120 CE	Abhiraka		Vima Kadphises				...	...
120 CE	Bhumaka; Nahapana	PARATARAJAS; Yolamira	Kanishka I				Great Satrap Kharapallana and Satrap Vanaspara for Kanishka I	
130-230 CE	Jayadaman; Rudradaman I Damajadasri I Jivadaman; Rudrasimha I Satyadaman; Jivadaman; Rudrasena I	Bagamira; Arjuna; Hvaramira; Mirahvara	Vāsishka (c. 140 – c. 160); Huvishka (c. 160 – c. 190); Vasudeva I (c. 190 – to at least 230)					
230-280 CE	Samghadaman; Damasena; Damajadasri II; Viradaman; Isvaradatta; Yasodaman I Vijayasena; Damajadasri III; Rudrasena II; Visvasimha	Miratakhma; Kozana; Bhimarjuna; Koziya; Datarvharna; Datarvharna	INDO-SASANIANS; Ardashir I, Sassanid king and "Kushanshah" (c. 230 – 250); Peroz I, "Kushanshah" (c. 250 – 265); Hormizd I, "Kushanshah" (c. 265 – 295)			Kanishka II (c. 230 – 240); Vashishka (c. 240 – 250); Kanishka III (c. 250 – 275)		
280-300 CE	Bhratadarman	Datayola II	Hormizd II, "Kushanshah" (c. 295 – 300)			Vasudeva II (c. 275 – 310)		
300-320 CE	Visvasena; Rudrasimha II; Jivadaman		Peroz II, "Kushanshah" (c. 300 – 325)			Vasudeva III; Vasudeva IV; Vasudeva V Chhu (c. 310? – 325)		
320-388 CE	Yasodaman II; Rudradaman II; Rudrasena III; Simhasena; Rudrasena IV		Shapur II Sassanid king and "Kushanshah" (c. 325); Varhran I, Varhran II, Varhran III "Kushanshahs" (c. 325 – 350); Peroz III "Kushanshah" (c. 350 –360); HEPHTHALITE/ HUNAS invasions			Shaka I (c. 325 – 345); Kipunada (c. 345 – 375)		GUPTA EMPIRE; Chandragupta I Samudragupta
388-395 CE	Rudrasimha III		Chandragupta II					
