= Rudrasena I (Saka king) =

Western Kshatrapa ruler from 200 to 222

- Western Satrap king
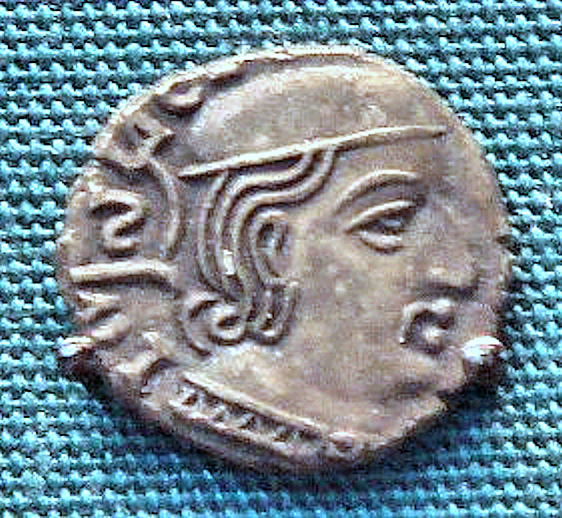
- Rudrasena I, Saka year 136 (214 CE).
- Reign: 200–222
- Predecessor: Jivadaman, Satyadaman
- Successor: Prthivisena, Samghadaman
- Father: Rudrasimha I

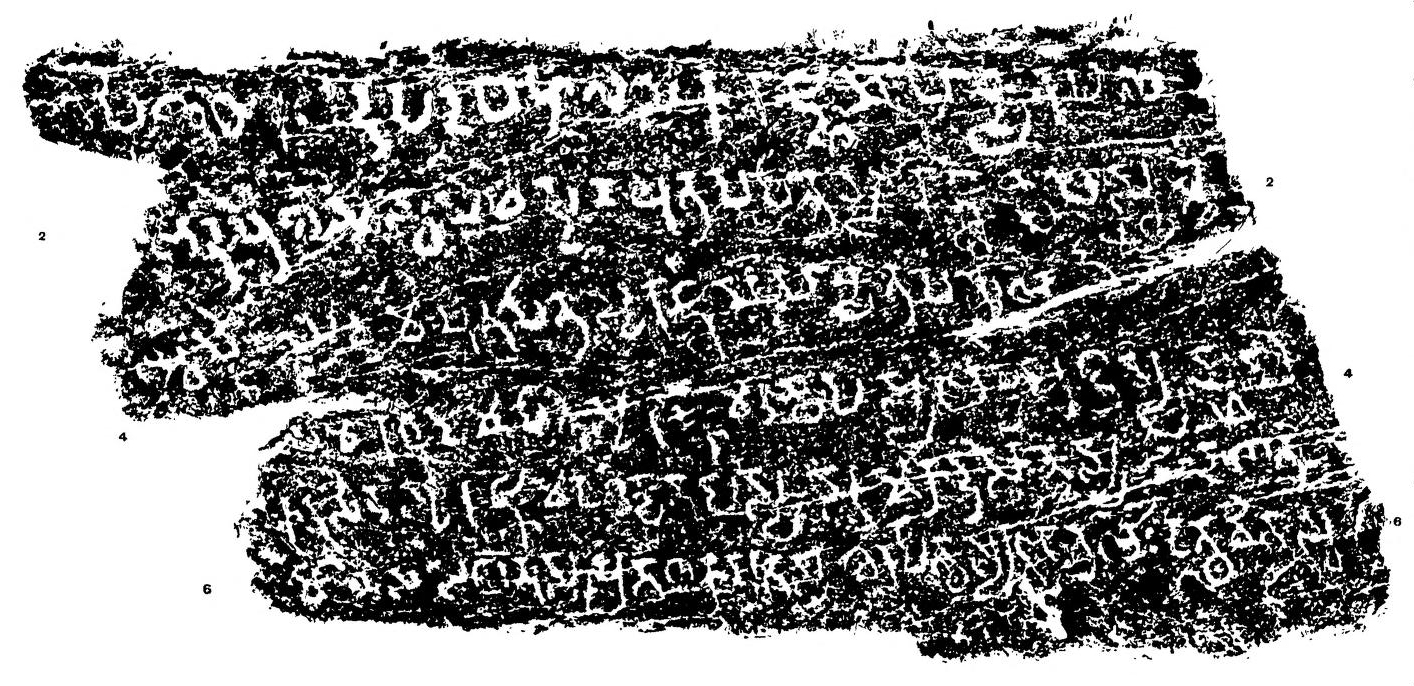
Gadha (Jasdan) inscription of Rudrasena, Saka Year 127 (204-205 CE).

Rudrasena I (r. 200–222) was a Saka ruler of the Western Satrap dynasty in the area of Malwa in ancient India. During his reign, the Saka ksatrapas remained strong after a period of instability during the reign of Rudrasimha I.

== Biography ==
He is mainly known from his coins. Several have a date in Brahmi numerals on the reverse (such as 142 Saka Era = 220 CE). The reverse shows a three-arched hill or Chaitya, with a river, a crescent moon and the sun, within a legend in Brahmi "Rajno Mahaksatrapasa Rudrasihaputrasa Rajno Mahaksatrapasa Rudrasenasa", "The great satrap Rudrasena, son of the great satrap Rudrasiha".

== Reign ==
Rudrasena succeeded his cousin Jivadaman, who had no sons, as a ruler of the Western Satraps.

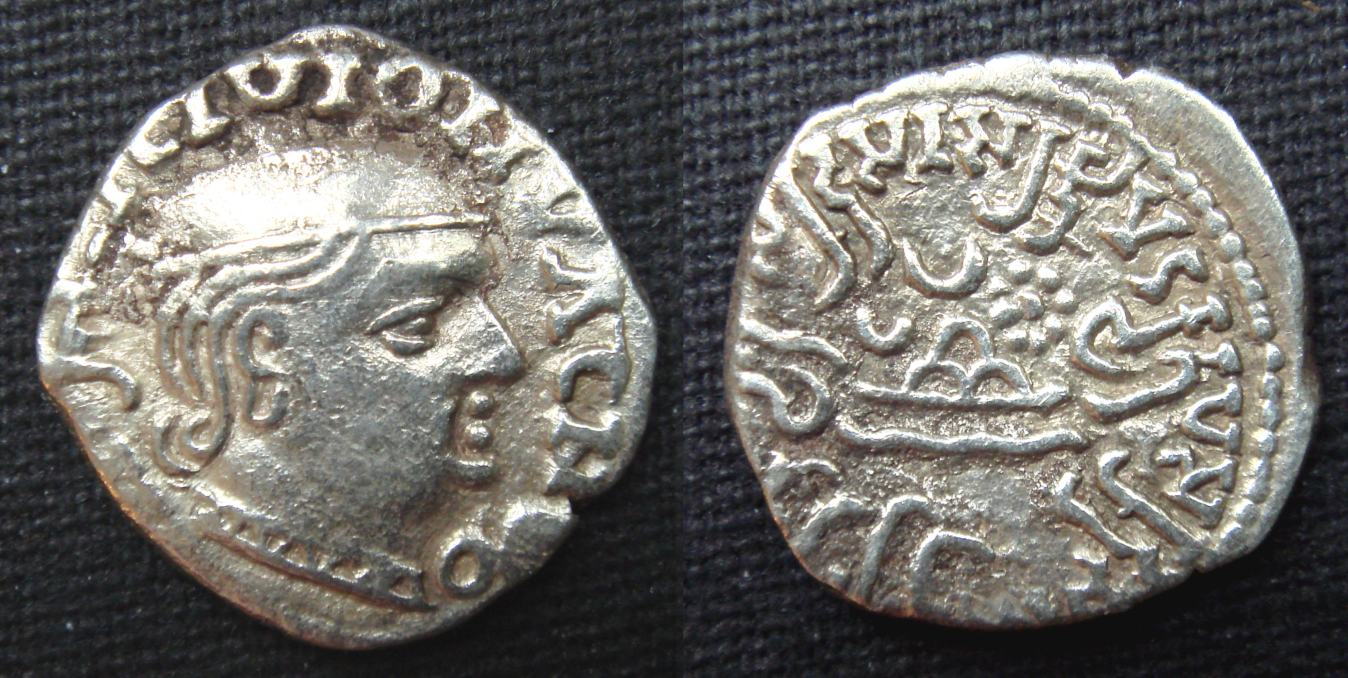
Coin of Rudrasena I (200–222). Brahmi date: 131 Saka era. 16mm, 2.2 grams. Obverse: portrait of the ruler, with pseudo-Greek legend around (..ΥΙΟΙΙΥΛΙΗΟ..) and date (131) to left in Brahmi. Reverse: Chaitya hill, with Brahmi legend around (starting at 1 o'clock): Rudrasena I (Brahmi coin legend) "King and Satrap Rudrasena, son of King and Great Satrap Rudrasimha".

His sister Prabhudama was perhaps married to a ruler of Vaishali. After his death, the Malavas under their king Soma re-asserted their independence from the Saka satraps.

| Preceded by Jivadaman | Western Satrap; 200–222 | Succeeded by Samghadaman |
