= Rudradaman I =

Western Kshatrapa ruler from 130 to 150

Rudradāman I
- Western Satrap; Rajno Ksatrapasa Jayadamasaputrasa Rajno Mahaksatrapasa Rudradamasa
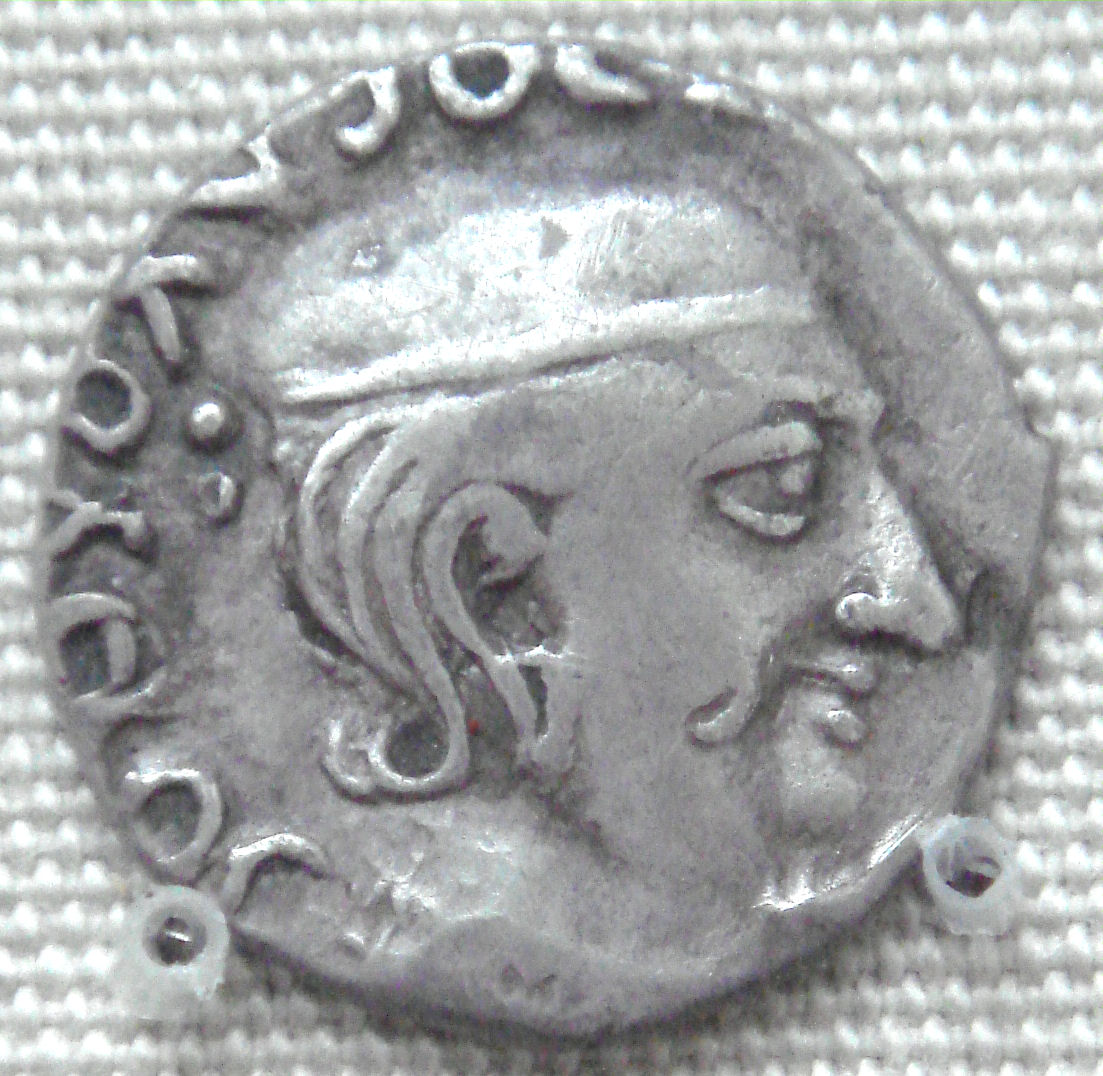
- Rudradāman I coin, with corrupted Greek legend. British Museum.
- Reign: 130–150
- Predecessor: Jayadaman
- Successor: Damajadasri I
- Issue: Damajadasri I, Rudrasimha I

Rudradāman I (r. 130–150) was a Śaka ruler from the Western Kshatrapas dynasty. He was the grandson of the king Caṣṭana. Rudradāman I was instrumental in the decline of the Sātavāhana Empire. Rudradāman I took up the title of Maha-kshtrapa ("Great Satrap"), after he became the king and then strengthened his kingdom.

== Reign ==
As a result of his victories, Rudradāman regained all the former territories previously held by Nahapana, except for the southern territory of Poona and Nasik. The indigenous Nagas also were aggressive toward Śaka kshatrapas. Sātavāhana dominions were limited to their original base in the Deccan and eastern central India around Amaravati:

"Rudradaman (...) who is the lord of the whole of eastern and western Akaravanti (Akara: East Malwa and Avanti: West Malwa), the Anupa country, Anarta, Surashtra, Svabhra (northern Gujarat) Maru (Marwar), Kachchha (Cutch), Sindhu-Sauvira (Sindh and Multan districts), Kukura (Eastern Rajputana), Aparanta ("Western Border" - Northern Konkan), Nishada (an aboriginal tribe, Malwa and parts of Central India) and other territories gained by his own valour, the towns, marts and rural parts of which are never troubled by robbers, snakes, wild beasts, diseases and the like, where all subjects are attached to him, (and) where through his might the objects of [religion], wealth and pleasure [are duly attained]".

— Junagadh rock inscription. Geographical interpretations in parentheses from Rapson.

=== War with the Yaudheyas ===
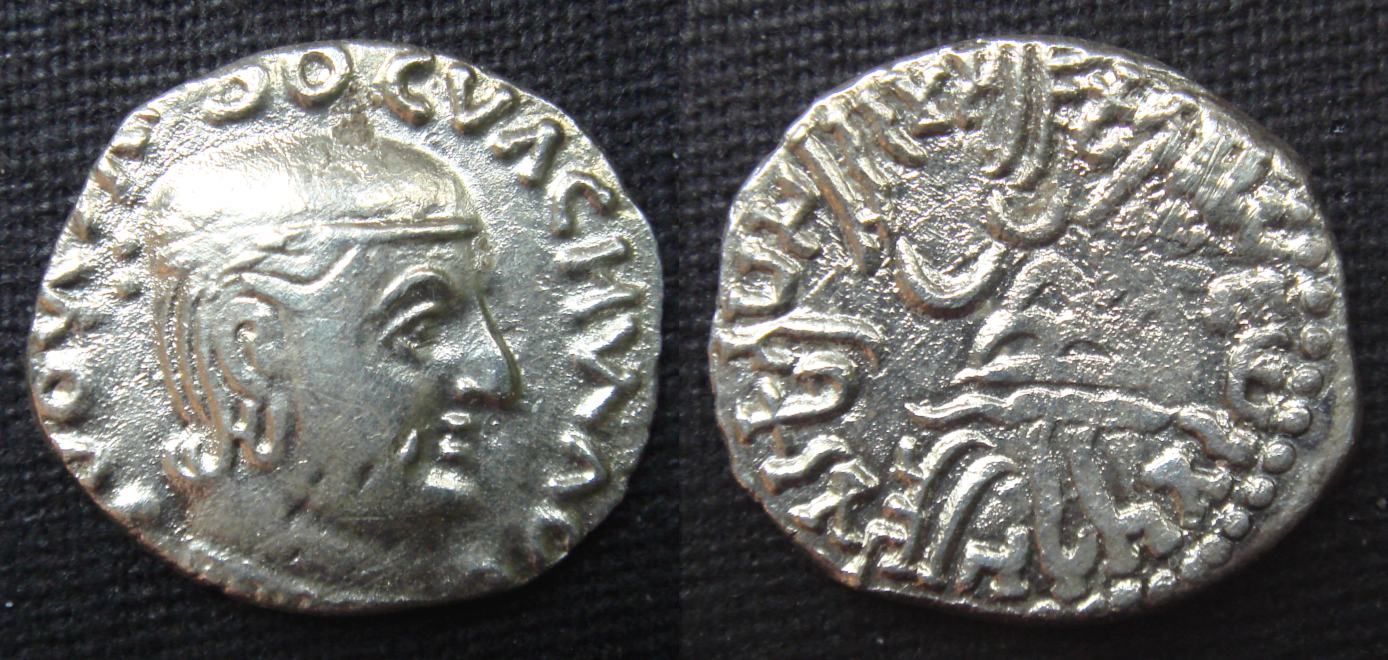
Silver coin of Rudradāman I, 16 mm, 2.0 grams. Obv: Bust of Rudradāman, with corrupted Greek legend "OVONIΛOOCVΛCHΛNO". Rev: Three-arched hill or Chaitya with river, crescent and sun. Brahmi legend around (from 12 o'clock): Rudradaman I, Brahmi coin legend. "Rajno Ksatrapasa Jayadamasaputrasa Rajno Mahaksatrapasa Rudradamasa": "King and Great Satrap Rudradaman, son of King and Satrap Jayadaman"

Rudradāman conquered the Yaudheya tribes in present day Haryana, as described in the Girnar rock inscription of Rudradaman. Rudradaman refers to the Yaudheyas as a militant republic of kshatriyas that confronted him as opposed to submitting:

"Rudradaman (...) who by force destroyed the Yaudheyas who were loath to submit, rendered proud as they were by having manifested their' title of' heroes among all Kshatriyas."

— Junagadh rock inscription of Rudradaman

However, the Yaudheyas soon reestablished themselves as independent. Within the next century the warlike Yaudheyas became more powerful. The Yaudheyas were then conquered by the Kushan Empire, who were the suzerains of the Western Kshatrapas, until ultimately by the Gupta Empire.

=== Wars with the Satavahana Dynasty ===
Rudradāman fought many battles against the Sātavāhanas (or the Āndhras) and Vashishtiputra Satakarni, the son of the Āndhra king Pulamayi, in an effort to end the hostilities, married the daughter of Rudradāman. The inscription relating the marriage between Rudradāman's daughter and Vashishtiputra Satakarni appears in a cave at Kanheri:

"Of the queen ... of the illustrious Satakarni Vasishthiputra, descended from the race of Karddamaka kings, (and) daughter of the Mahakshatrapa Ru(dra)....... .........of the confidential minister Sateraka, a water-cistern, the meritorious gift.

— Kanheri inscription of Rudradaman I's daughter".

Rudradaman maintained matrimonial relationships with Sātavāhanas and conceded the country of Aparanta to Vashishtiputra Satakarni, his son-in-law and younger son of Gautamiputra Satakarni, as dowry. In spite of the matrimonial link, at least two wars took place between them wherein he defeated Sātavāhanas but spared the life of Satakarni (probably, Vashishtiputra Satakarni), essentially because of their relationship. However, it is not known who was the aggressor in either of the wars and whether there were more wars between them.

"Rudradaman (...) who obtained good report because he, in spite of having twice in fair fight completely defeated Satakarni, the lord of Dakshinapatha, on account of the nearness of their connection did not destroy him."

— Junagadh rock inscription

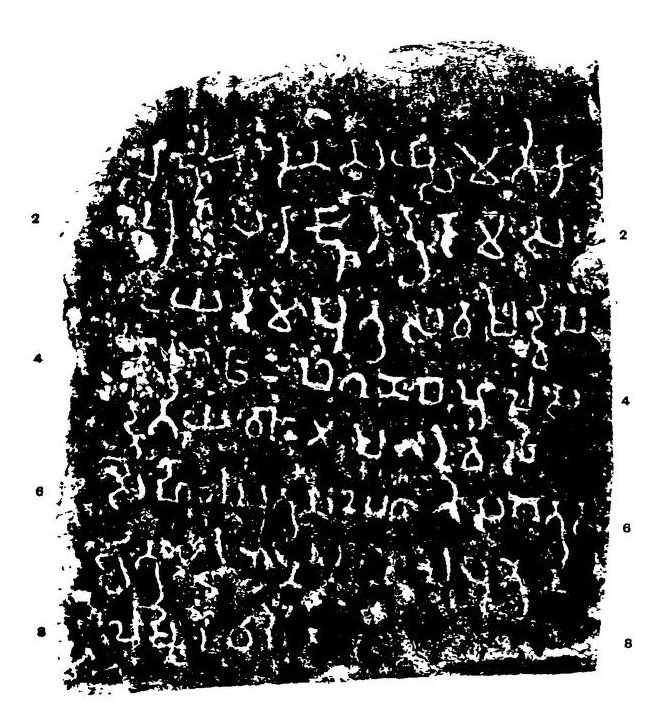
Andhau stone inscription of the time of Rudradāman, Śaka Year 52 (130 CE). The inscription reads: "In the year fifty-two, 50, 2; on the second day of the dark half of Phaguna, of (the reign of) the king Rudradāman, son of Jayadaman, (who was the grandson) of the king Caṣṭana, son of Ysamotika, (this) staff was raised in memory of Rishabhadeva, son of Sihila, of the Opasati gotra, by (his) brother, Madana, son of Sihila."

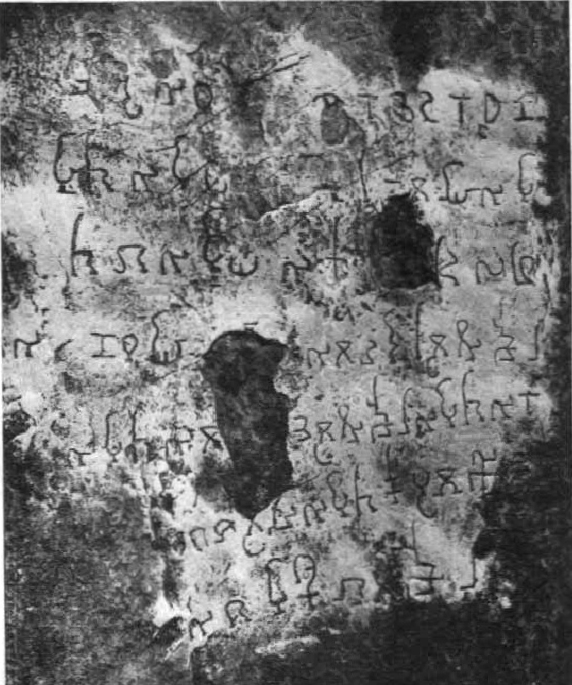
Genealogical stone inscription of Rudradāman: "Ghsamotika, his son rajan mahakshatrapa svamin Caṣṭana, his son rajan svamin Jayadāman, and his son rajan svamin Rudradaman." Khavada, Kutch district.

== Other details ==
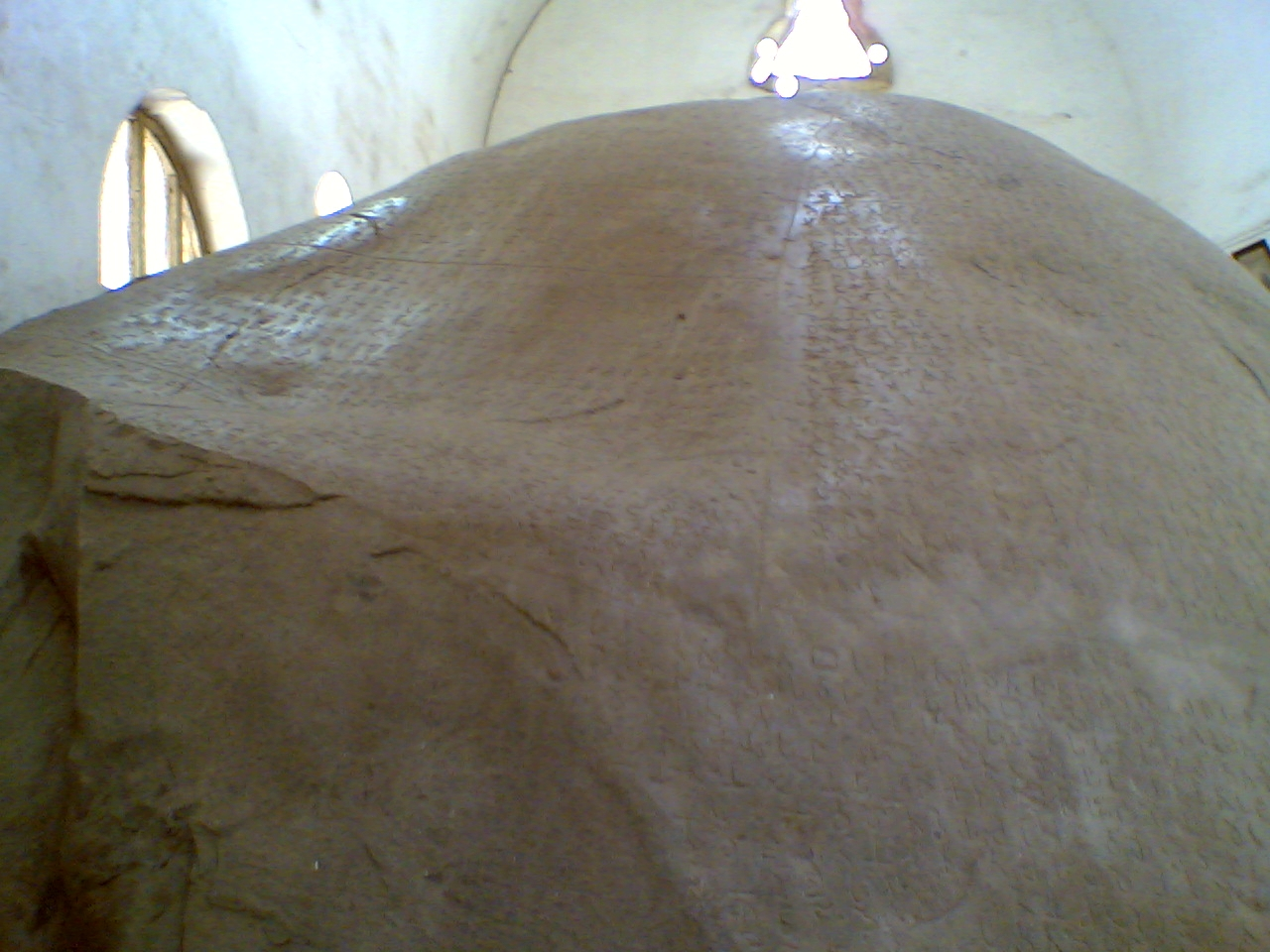
The Junagadh rock contains inscriptions by Ashoka (fourteen of the Edicts of Ashoka), Rudradāman I and Skandagupta.

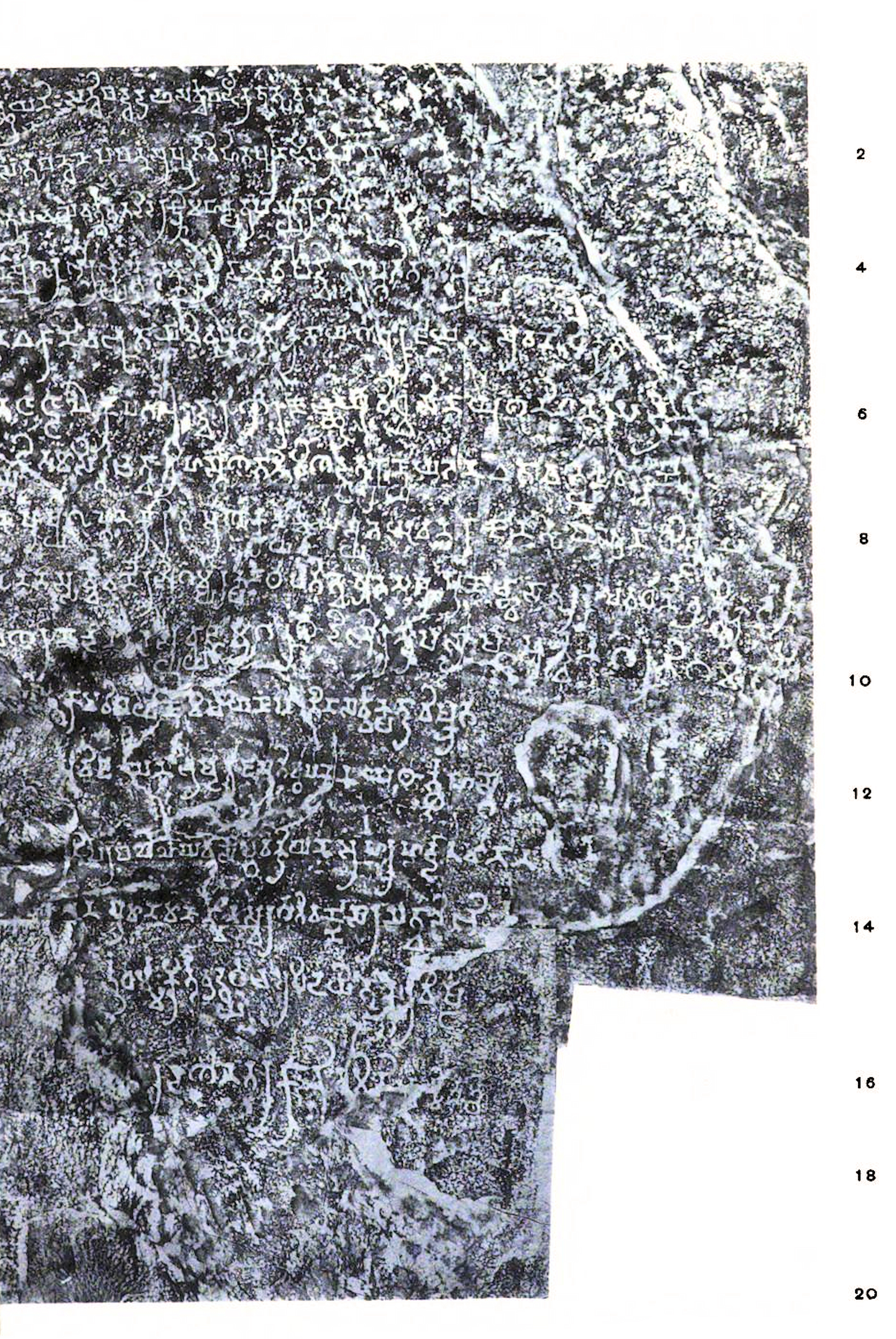
A portion of the Junagadh rock inscription of Rudradaman.

The Sanskrit Junagadh inscription dated 150 CE credits Rudradāman I with supporting the cultural arts and Sanskrit literature and repairing the dam built by the Mauryans. He in fact repaired the embankments of the lake Sudarśana, which was constructed by the Mauryas for checking floods.

Rudradāman is also known as the king who was ruling when the Greek writer Yavanesvara translated the Yavanajataka from Greek to Sanskrit, which influenced astrology in India.

While most of the scholars, following Rapson believe that Rudradāman ruled from Ujjain, there is no such evidence to support this. In fact, there is evidence to prove the contrary:

1. Jain sources mention that after Nahapana (40 years) and Gardabhilas (15 years), Śakas will rule Ujjain but for only four years. Caṣṭana no doubt has ruled Ujjain but he must have ruled it only for four years. His son Jayadāman (a Kshatrapa as against Caṣṭana being a Mahaksatrapa) was an ineffectual king and lost most of the territory won by Caṣṭana. This must have included all important Ujjain as well.
2. Natural History of Claudius Ptolemy in 160 CE record Caṣṭana as the king of Avanti while it is known that it is Rudradāman who was ruling between 130 and 150 CE. Ptolemy was obviously referring only to the last best known ruler and if Rudradāman was ruling Avanti, he would have mentioned him, since he was certainly well known through his conquests.
3. Truly speaking, Rudradāman made no reference to Avanti. He said he conquered Eastern and Western Akaravanti (Eastern Malwa) - Western Akaravanti being land lying east to Bhopal, which does not include any western part of Malwa or Avanti. Akaravanti, earlier called as Sudarsana, comprised only Eastern Malwa. Western Akaravanti does not refer to Avanti.

== Notes ==
| Preceded by Jayadaman | Western Satrap c. 130–150 | Succeeded by Damajadasri I |
