= Damajadasri I =

2nd-century Western Kshatrapas dynasty ruler

- Western Satrap
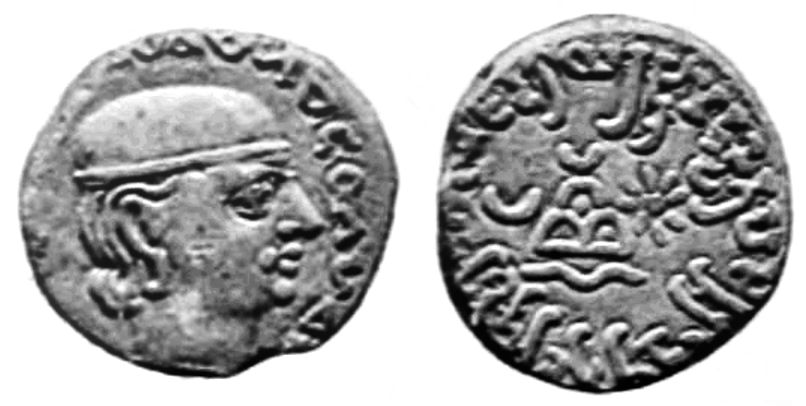
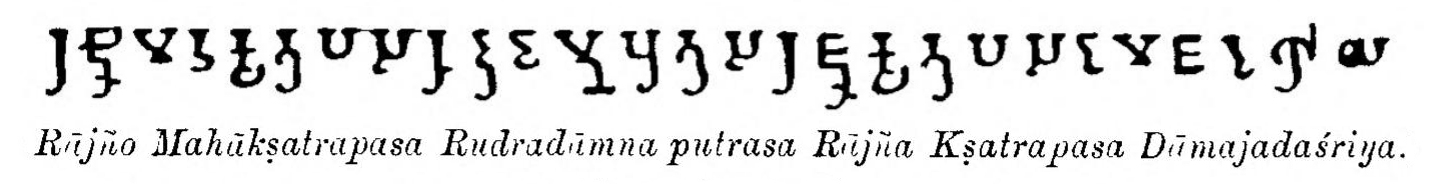
- Coin of Damajadasri I. Obverse: legend in pseudo-Greek letters, around portrait of the ruler. Obverse: Chaitya with Brahmi legend around (from 12:00): "King and Satrap Damajadaśri, son of King and Great Satrap Rudradaman".
- Reign: 170–175 CE
- Predecessor: Rudradaman I
- Successor: Jivadaman
- Issue: Jivadaman

Damajadaśri I (c. 170–175 CE) was a ruler of the Western Kshatrapas dynasty. He was the son of Rudradaman I.

== Reign ==
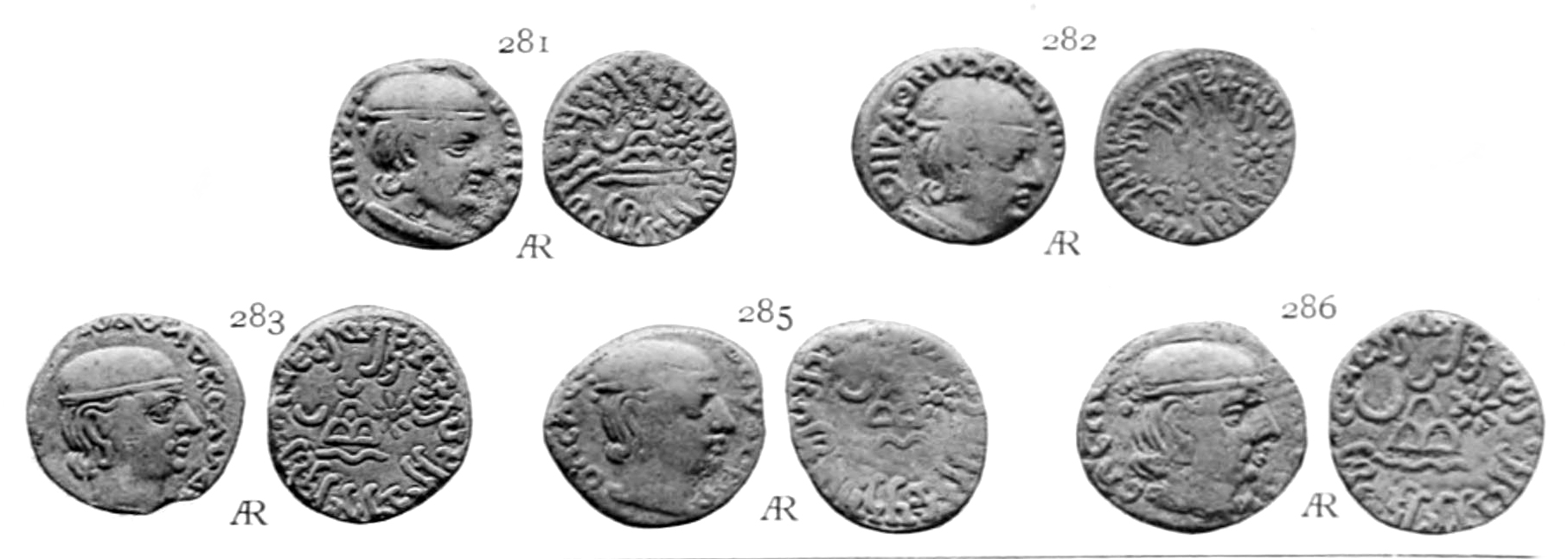
Coin types of Damajadasri I.

His reign saw the decline of dynasty after his dominions were conquered by the Satavahanas and saw the rise of the Abhiras in the south and Malavas in the north. He is also known as Damaysada, Damazada or Damaghsada. Jha and Rajgor considers Damajadasri and Damazada different persons. Tandon thinks they are one and the same, and his name should be read Dāmazāda.

Damaysada’s name is missing from the official family tree that was recorded during the time of his brother and nephew. Although these records usually show only the main line from father to son and often leave out side branches, Rapson believes that Damaysada was deliberately left out because, after his death, his brother Rudrasimha I and his son Jivadaman fought over who should become the king.

Preceded by Rudradaman I	Western Satrap c. 170–175	Succeeded by Jivadaman
