= Jayadaman =

- Western Satrap
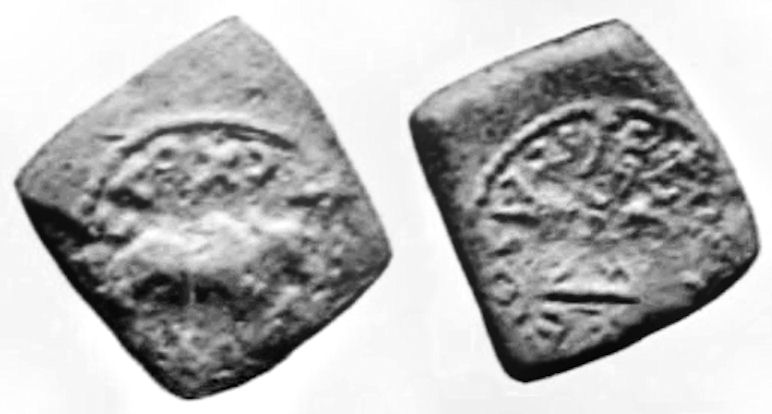
- Coin of Jayadaman.
- Reign: 130 CE?
- Predecessor: Chastana
- Successor: Rudradaman I
- Issue: Rudradaman I, Indradaman
- Father: Chastana

Jayadaman was a Western Kshatrapa ruler, although possibly only a Kshatrapa, rather than a Mahakshatrapa. He was the son of Chastana, and the father of Rudradaman I and Indradaman but he may have pre-deceased Chastana, and never ruled as supreme ruler of the Western Kshatrapas. This is suggested by the fact that Chastana and Rudraman I are known from contemporary Indian inscriptions to have ruled jointly.

His diminished title may also have been a consequence of the conquests of the Satavahanas over Kshatrapa territory. He is believed to have reigned around 130 AD.

The coins of Jayadaman were rather crude, most made of copper/potin and square and earlier it was believed that these were the only coins of his issued. We now have conventional silver drachms of two types from his reign.

== Notes ==
Preceded by Chastana	Western Satrap; 130 CE?	Succeeded by Rudradaman I
