= Saka–Satavahana Wars =

1st-2nd century wars in India

Date	15 CE–2nd century CE
Location	Central India and the Deccan
Result	Satavahana victory
Territorial changes	Status quo ante bellum (short-term change); Western Satraps significantly weakened.; Satvahanas split into smaller kingdoms (long-term change)

Belligerents
Satavahana dynasty	Western Satraps; Supported by Kushan Empire Indo-Greek kingdom Indo-Parthian kingdom

Commanders and leaders
Sundara Satkarni; Chakara Satkarni; Sivasvati; Gautamiputra Satkarni; Vashishtiputra Satakarni (POW); Sri Yajna Sātakarni	Nahapana †?; Ushavadata †/ (POW); Rudradaman I; Rudrasimha I

The Saka—Satavahana wars were a series of conflicts between the Western Satraps and the Satavahanas in the first and second century CE. Both sides achieved success at varying points during the conflicts, but in the end, the Satavahanas prevailed. However, constant wars with the Sakas severely weakened them and was a major contributor in their fall.

== History ==
=== Wars ===
==== First phase ====
The Saka ruler Bhumaka was succeeded by his son Nahapana who became a very powerful ruler. During 15-40 CE, he occupied portions of the Satavahana empire in western and central India. He is known to have ruled the former Satavahana territory, as attested by the inscriptions of his governor and son-in-law, Rishabhadatta. Nahapana Nahapana held sway over Malwa, Southern Gujarat, and Northern Konkan, from Bharuch to Sopara and the Nasik and Poona districts.

It was probably during the reign of Satavahana king Sivasvati that the Kshaharatas invaded Northern Maharastra and Vidarbha and occupied the districts of Pune and Nashik, forcing the Satavahanas to abandon their capital Junnar and to move to Prastisthana (modern Paithan) in the vicinity of Aurangabad.

==== Second phase ====
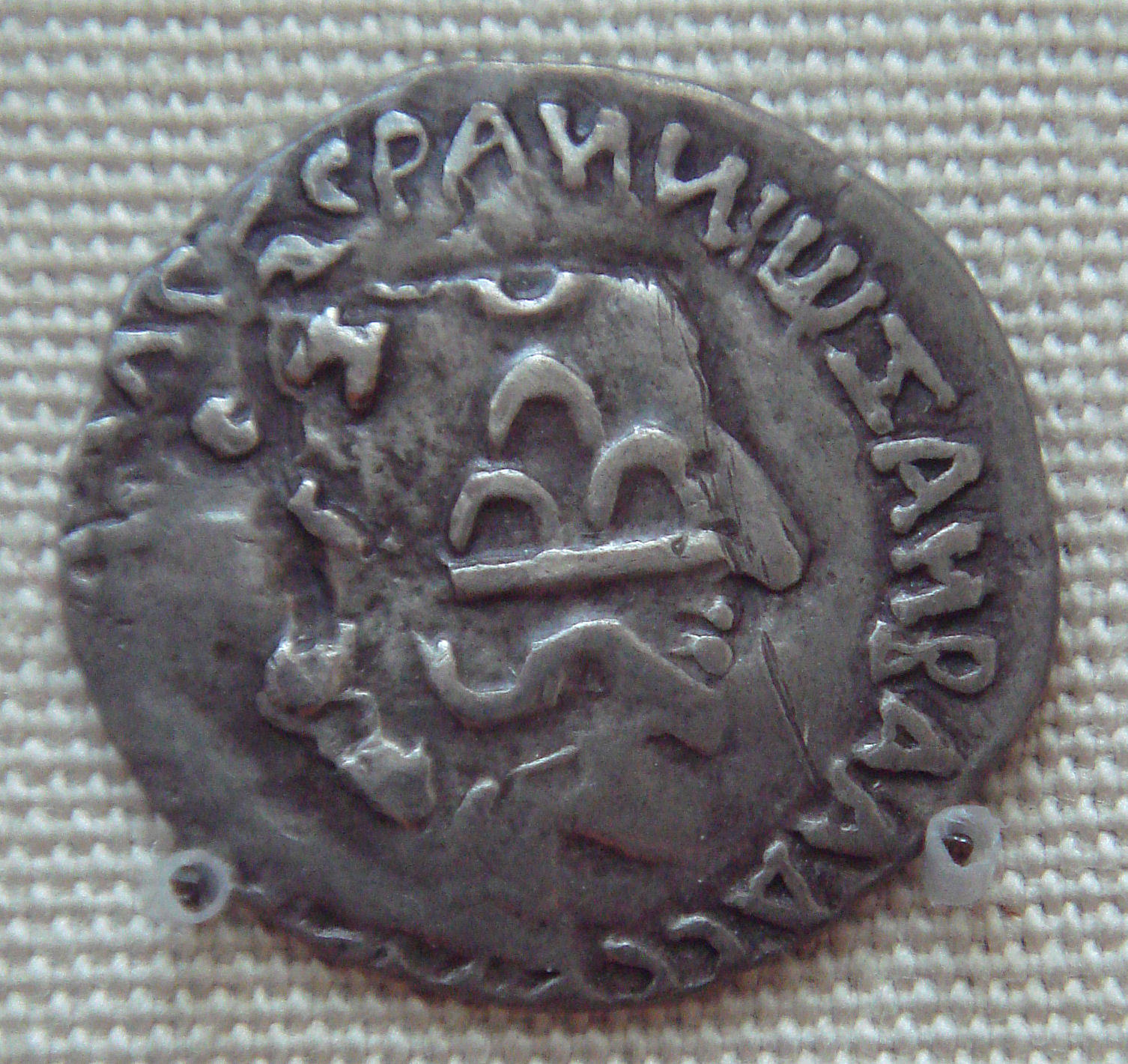
A coin of Nahapana restruck by the Satavahana king Gautamiputra Satakarni. Nahapana's profile and coin legend are still clearly visible.

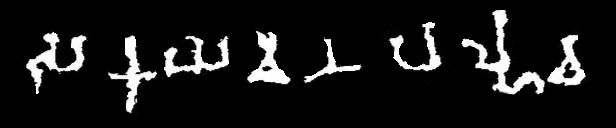
The defeated "Saka-Yavana-Palhava" (Brahmi script: 𑀲𑀓 𑀬𑀯𑀦 𑀧𑀮𑁆𑀳𑀯) mentioned in the Nasik cave 3 inscription of Queen Gotami Balasiri (end of line 5 of the inscription).

The Satavahana power was revived by Gautamiputra Satakarni, who is considered the greatest of the Satavahana rulers. The king defeated by him appears to have been the Western Kshatrapa ruler Nahapana, as suggested by Nahapana's coins overstruck with names and titles of Gautamiputra. The Nashik prashasti inscription of Gautamiputra's mother Gautami Balashri, dated to the 20th year after his death, records his achievements. The Nashik prashasti inscription states that Gautamiputra uprooted the Kshaharata (or Khagarata) family, to which Nahapana belonged. The Nashik inscription dated to the 18th year of Gautamiputra's reign states that he reaffirmed a grant of land to Buddhist monks living at the Triraśmi peak. This land was earlier in the possession of Nahapana's son-in-law Rishabhadatta (also known as Ushavadata), who had donated it to the monks. He (Gautamiputra Satkarni) claimed victory on them in an inscription at Cave No. 3 of the Pandavleni Caves in Nashik:

Gautamiputra Satakarni (…) who crushed down the pride and conceit of the Kshatriyas; who destroyed the Sakas (Western Satraps), Yavanas (Indo-Greeks) and Pahlavas (Indo-Parthians), who rooted out the Khakharata family (the Kshaharata family of Nahapana); who restored the glory of the Satavahana race.

— Inscription of Queen Mother Gautami Balashri at Cave No. 3 of the Pandavleni Caves in Nashik.

==== Third phase ====
A satrap named Chastana founded the Kardamaka dynasty after Nahapana's death. His successor was probably his grandson, Rudradaman I. The Satavahanas were the aggressors of the next war. The conflict between Rudradaman I and Satavahanas became so gruelling, that in order to contain the conflict, a matrimonial relationship was concluded by giving Rudradaman's daughter to the Satavahana king Vashishtiputra Satakarni. The inscription relating the marriage between Rudradaman's daughter and Vashishtiputra Satakarni appears in a cave at Kanheri:

Of the queen ... of the illustrious Satakarni Vasishthiputra, descended from the race of Karddamaka kings, (and) daughter of the Mahakshatrapa Ru(dra)....... .........of the confidential minister Sateraka, a water-cistern, the meritorious gift.

— Kanheri inscription of Rudradaman I's daughter.

The Satavahanas and the Western Satraps remained at war however, and Rudradaman I defeated the Satavahanas twice in these conflicts, only sparing the life of Vashishtiputra Satakarni due to their family alliance:

Rudradaman (...) who obtained good report because he, in spite of having twice in fair fight completely defeated Satakarni, the lord of Dakshinapatha, on account of the nearness of their connection did not destroy him.

— Junagadh rock inscription of Rudradaman

Rudradaman regained all the previous territories held by Nahapana, probably with the exception of the southern areas of Poona and Nasik (epigraphical remains in these two areas at that time are exclusively Satavahana):

==== Fourth (last phase) ====
In later years, Yajna Sri Satakarni of the Šātavāhana dynasty emerged as a formidable figure, extending his influence over the southern territories of the Western Satraps. His coinage, adorned with images of ships, hints at the maritime prowess of the Andhra region under his rule. Beyond just Aparanta and the expansive Deccan region, there are indications that his authority may have stretched into the eastern reaches of the Central Provinces. Regarded as the culminating figure of the Satavahana lineage, his reign marked the pinnacle of their power. However, following his demise, the vast realm underwent fragmentation, giving rise to numerous independent principalities, likely still under the sway of the Šātavāhana legacy.

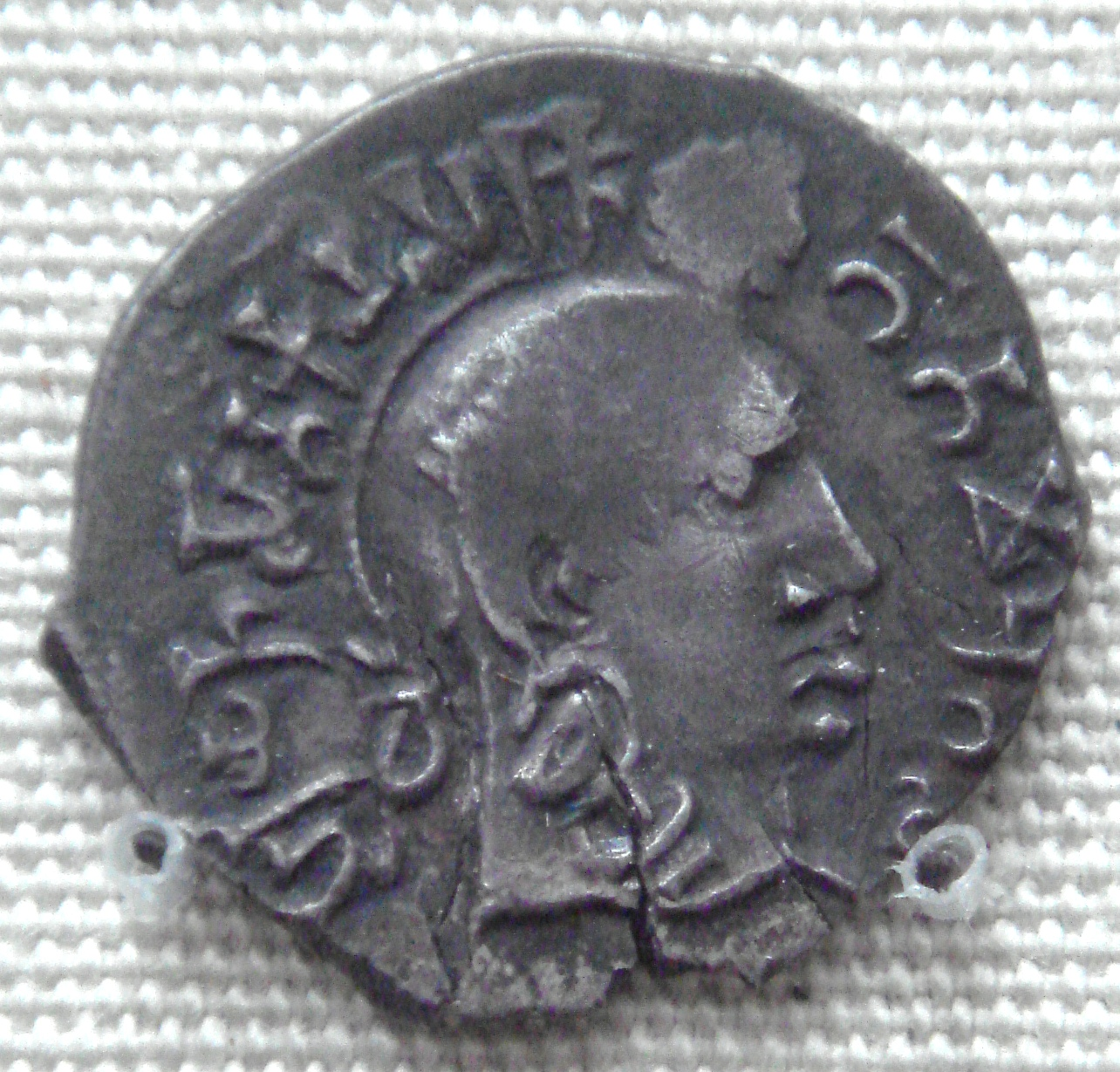
A coin of Gautmiputra Rajni Sri Satkarni (Yajna Sri Satkarni)

The wars exhausted the resources of both kingdoms, especially the Satavahanas, which was a major factor in their decline. On the other hand, the Saka satraps would continue to prosper for the next two centuries, until their extinction by the Gupta Empire.

== See also ==
- Satavahana Empire
- Western Satraps
- Nahapana
- Rudradaman I
- Gautamiputra Satakarni
- Sri Yajna Sātakarni
- List of wars involving India

== Sources ==
- Sudhakar Chattopadhyaya (1974). Some Early Dynasties of South India. Motilal Banarsidass. ISBN 978-81-208-2941-1.
- R.C.C. Fynes (1995). "The Religious Patronage of the Satavahana Dynasty". South Asian Studies. 11 (1): 43–50. doi:10.1080/02666030.1995.9628494.
- Charles Higham (2009). Encyclopedia of Ancient Asian Civilizations. Infobase. ISBN 9781438109961.
