= Gautamiputra Satakarni =

Satavahana ruler

- Khatiya-dapa-mana-madana; Rajaraja; Maharaja
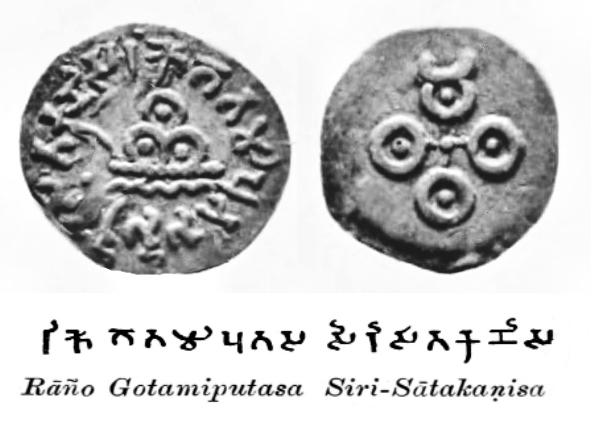
- Coinage of Gautamiputra Satakarni with Brahmi script legend "King Lord Satakarni, son of Gotami", starting at 12 o'clock. The decorative designs are the "Three-arched hill" and the "Ujain symbol". These coins were overstruck on silver coins of Nahapana.

Satavahana king
- Reign: c. 60 – c. 85
- Predecessor: Sivasvati
- Successor: Vasisthiputra Sri Pulamavi
- Spouse: Vasisthi
- Military career
- Conflicts: Saka-Satavahana Wars
- Issue: Vasisthiputra Sri Pulamavi, Vashishtiputra Satakarni
- Dynasty: Satavahana
- Mother: Gautami Balashri

Gautamiputra Satakarni (Brahmi: 𑀕𑁄𑀢𑀫𑀺𑀧𑀼𑀢 𑀲𑀸𑀢𑀓𑀡𑀺, Gotamiputa Sātakaṇi, IAST: Gautamīputra Śātakarṇi) was a ruler of the Satavahana Empire in present-day Deccan region of India. He was mentioned as the important and greatest ruler of Satavahana Dynasty. He ruled in the 1st or 2nd century CE, although his exact period is uncertain. His reign is dated variously: 86-110 CE, c. 103-127 CE, 106-130 CE, or more recently and specifically ca. 60-85 CE.

The information available about Gautamiputra Satakarni comes from his coins, the Satavahana inscriptions, and the royal genealogies in the various Puranas. The best known of these is the Nashik prashasti (eulogy) inscription of his mother Gautami Balashri, which credits him with extensive military conquests. Historical evidence suggests that Gautamiputra revived the Satavahana power after a decline caused by Saka invasions.

== Ancestry ==
Except the Brahmanda Purana, all the Puranas that contain the genealogy of Satavahana kings mention Gautamiputra. According to Bhagavata, Matsya and Vishnu Puranas, his predecessor was Shivasvati (IAST: Śivasvāti). However, Shivasvati remains historically unattested: no coins or inscriptions issued by him have been discovered. The Vayu Purana names the predecessor of Gautamiputra as Shivasvami (IAST: Śivasvāmi). The Brahmanada Purana does not mention the name "Gautamiputra" at all; instead it names a king called "Yantramati", who ruled for 34 years, and was preceded by Svātisena.

The mother of Gautamiputra Satakarni was Gautami Balashri (IAST: Gautami Bālaśri), as attested by Nasik prashasti, an inscription found at Cave No.3 of the Pandavleni Caves in Nashik. The inscription is dated to the 19th regnal year of his son Vasishthiputra Pulumavi (or Pulumayi). It records the grant of a village to the Buddhist monks of the Bhadrayaniya sect.

"Gautamiputra" literally means "son of Gautami", while Satakarni is a title common to several Satavahana kings. Such matronymics also appear in the names of other Satavahana kings, including Vasishthiputra Pulumavi ("Pulumavi, son of Vasishthi"). These do not indicate a matriarchy or a matrilineal descent system. The real explanation for matronymics seems to be that since the rulers married a number of wives from different royal families, a prince was best identified with reference to his mother.

== Military conquests ==
Historical evidence suggests that the Western Kshatrapas (known to the Satavahanas as Shakas) expanded their empire at the expense of Satavahanas in the years preceding the reign of Gautamiputra Satakarni. Based on the Nashik inscription of his mother, it appears that Gautamiputra revived the Satavahana power. The inscription states that he defeated the Shakas (Western Kshatrapas), the Pahlavas (Indo-Parthians), and the Yavanas (Indo-Greeks). It also states that he emerged victorious in several fights against a confederacy of enemies.

=== Imperial extent according to Nashik prashasti ===
The Nashik prashasti inscription of Gautamiputra's mother, located in the Nasik Caves, calls him the "king of kings", and states that his orders were obeyed by the circle of all kings. It indicates that his rule extended from Malwa and Saurashtra in the north to Krishna River in the south; and from Konkan in the west to Vidarbha (Berar) in the east. It states that he ruled the following regions:

Approximate extent of the Satavahana empire under Gautamiputra Satkarni, as suggested by the Nashik prashasti inscription. (John Keay, 2008)

- Asika (area in Godavari valley)
- Aśmaka (Ashmaka in Godavari valley)
- Muḍhaka or Mulaka (area around Paithan)
- Surāṣṭra (Saurashtra)
- Kukura
- Aparanta (north Konkan)
- Anupa (area around Mahishmati in Narmada valley)
- Vidarbha (Berar)
- Akara-Avanti (eastern and western Malwa)

The identity of "Kukura" is uncertain. R G Bhandarkar identified it with a part of Rajputana, while Alexander Cunningham identified it with Gurjara. Sudhakar Chattopadhyaya identified it with an area in Madhya Pradesh, possibly near the western part of the Vindhyas.

The inscription also calls Gautamiputra the lord of following mountains:

- Vindhyāvat (part of Vindhyas)
- Pāriyātra (part of Vindhyas)
- Sahya (Western Ghats)
- Krishnagiri (Kanhagiri)
- Malaya (southern portion of Western Ghats)
- Mahendra
- Sreshtha-giri or Setagiri
- Chakora

Sudhakar Chattopadhyaya identifies Mahendra, Sreshtha-giri and Chakora with portions of Eastern Ghats. He, therefore, believes that Gautamiputra's empire included the Telangana and Coastal Andhra regions. M. Rama Rao also supports this theory on the basis of coins discovered in the eastern Deccan region. Although coins can travel via trade, Chattopadhyaya believes that the Nashik inscription corroborates this theory. However, there are no other records of Satavahana presence in the eastern Deccan region before the period of his son Vashishtiputra Pulumavi.

The "Nashik prashasti", inscription of Queen Gotami Balasiri
Nasik Cave No.3, inscription No.2 (reign of Sri Pulumavi)

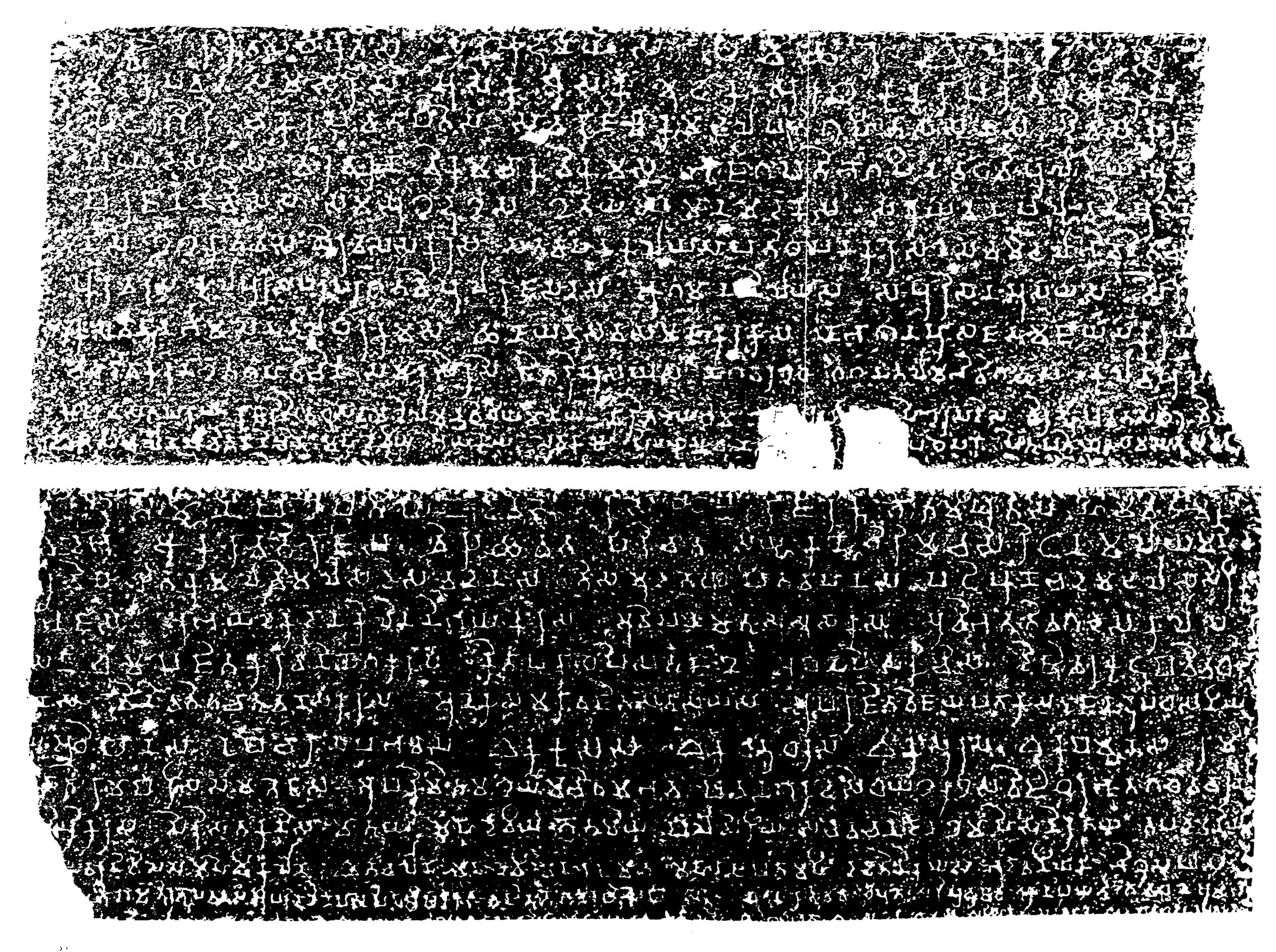
Full inscription of Queen Gotami Balasiri (rubbing).

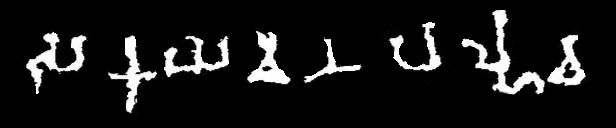
The defeated "Saka-Yavana-Palhava" (Brahmi script: 𑀲𑀓 𑀬𑀯𑀦 𑀧𑀮𑁆𑀳𑀯) mentioned in the Nasik cave 3 inscription of Queen Gotami Balasiri (end of line 5 of the inscription).

"Success! In the nineteenth -19th- year of king Siri-Pulumayi Vasithiputra, in the second -2nd- fortnight of summer, on the thirteenth -13th- day, the great queen Gotami Balasiri, delighting in truth, charity, patience and respect for life; bent on penance, self-control, restraint and abstinence; fully working out the type of a royal Rishi's wife; the mother of the king of kings, Siri-Satakani Gotamiputa,

- who was in strength equal to mount Himavat, mount Meru, mount Mandara; king of Asika, Asaka, Mulaka, Suratha, Kukura, Aparanta, Anupa, Vidabha, Akaravanti; lord of the mountains Vindhya, Chhavata, Parichata, Sahya, Kanhagiri, Macha, Siritana, Malaya, Mahendra, Setagiri, Chakora; obeyed by the circle of all kings on earth;
- whose face was beautiful and pure like the lotus opened by the rays of the sun; whose chargers had drunk the water of three oceans; whose face was lovely and radiant like the orb of the full moon; whose gait was beautiful like the gait of a choice elephant; whose arms were as muscular and rounded, broad and long as the folds of the lord of serpents; whose fearless hand was wet by the water poured out to impart fearlessness; of unchecked obedience towards his mother; who properly devised time and place for the pursuit of the triple object (of human activity); who sympathised fully with the weal and woe of the citizens;
- who crushed down the pride and conceit of the Kshatriyas; who destroyed the Sakas, Yavanas and Palhavas; who never levied nor employed taxes but in conformity to justice; alien to hurting life even towards an offending enemy; the furtherer of the homesteads of the low as well as of the twice-born; who rooted out the Khakharata race; who restored the glory of the Satavahana family; whose feet were saluted by all provinces; who stopped the contamination of the four varnas; who conquered multitudes of enemies in many battles; whose victorious banner was unvanquished; whose capital was unassailable to his foes;
- who had inherited from a long line of ancestors the privilege of kingly music; the abode of traditional lore; the refuge of the virtuous; the asylum of Fortune; the fountain of good manners; the unique controller; the unique archer; the unique hero; the unique Brahmana; in prowess equal to Rama, Keshava, Arjuna and Bhimasena; liberal on festive days in unceasing festivities and assemblies; not inferior in lustre to Nabhaga, Nahusha, Janamejaya, Sagara, Yayati, Rama and Ambarisha; who, vanquishing his enemies in a way as constant as inexhaustible, unthinkable and marvelous; in battles fought by the Wind, Garuda, the Siddbas, the Yakshas, the Rakshasas, the Vidyadharas, the Bhutas, the Gandharvas, the Charanas, the Moon, the Son, the Asterisms and the Planets, (appeared to be himself) plunging into the sky from the shoulder of his choice elephant; (and) who (thus) raised his family to high fortune,

caused, as a pious gift, on the top of the Tiranhu mountain similar to the top of the Kailasa, (this) cave to be made quite equal to the divine mansions (there). And that cave the great queen, mother of a Maharaja and grandmother of a Maharaja, gives to the Sangha of monks in the person of the fraternity of the Bhadavaniyas; and for the sake of the embellishment of that cave, with a view to honour and please the great queen his grandmother, her grandson lord of [Dakshina]patha, making over the merit of the gift to his father, grants to this meritorious donation (vis. the cave) the village Pisajipadaka on the south-west side of mount Tiranhu.
Renunciation to the enjoyments of every kind."

— Nasik Caves inscription of Queen Gotami Balasiri, Cave No.3

An inscription at Karle records the grant of Karajika village (identified with a village in Pune district) by Gautamiputra, confirming that the Pune region was under his control.

The Nashik prashasti inscription further states that the horses of Gautamiputra drank waters of the "three oceans" (the Arabian Sea, the Bay of Bengal and the Indian Ocean). This implies that Gautamiputra subdued the Cholas and the Pandyas in southern India. However, there is no historical evidence of this. One view is that this is just a conventional literary device: Gautamiputra's empire was not as extensive as the inscription claims. Sudhakar Chattopadhyaya speculates that Gautamiputra might have raided some territories in the South.

According to American academic Carla M. Sinopoli, it is not clear if Gautamiputra actually had effective control over all the territories claimed as a part of his empire in the inscription. In any case, his military successes were short-lived.

=== Gautamiputra and Nahapana ===
Caves excavated by Gautamiputra Satakarni as well as the Western Kshatrapa king Nahapana are located at Nashik. The Nashik prashasti inscription states that Gautamiputra uprooted the Kshaharata (or Khagarata) family, to which Nahapana belonged. The Nashik inscription dated to the 18th year of Gautamiputra's reign states that he reaffirmed a grant of land to Buddhist monks living at the Triraśmi peak. This land was earlier in the possession of Nahapana's son-in-law Rishabhadatta (also known as Ushavadata), who had donated it to the monks.

A hoard of Nahapana's coins, discovered at Jogalthambi in Nashik district, includes coins re-struck by Gautamiputra. These coins feature an arched chaitya (Buddhist shrine) and the "Ujjain symbol" (a cross with four circles at the end).

Most historians now agree that Gautamiputra and Nahapana were contemporaries, and that Gautamiputra defeated Nahapana. M. K. Dhavalikar dates this event to c. 124 CE, which according to him, was the 18th regnal year of Gautamiputra. R.C.C. Fynes dates the event to sometime after 71 CE, in the same line, Shailendra Bhandare places the victory of Gautamiputra and the end of Nahapana's reign to the start of Saka era, 78 CE, in the year of Castana's accession, and considers Gautamiputra's whole reign to ca. 60-85 CE.

Coinage of Gautamiputra Satakarni
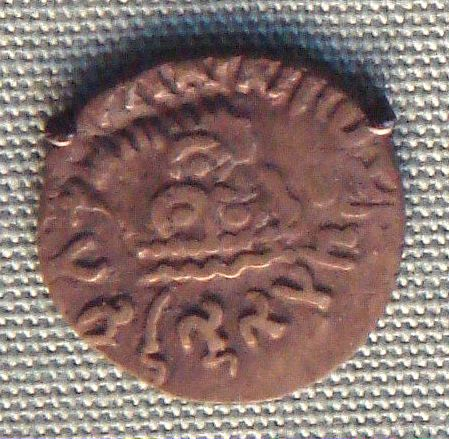
A coin of Nahapana, re-struck by Gautamiputra Satakarni

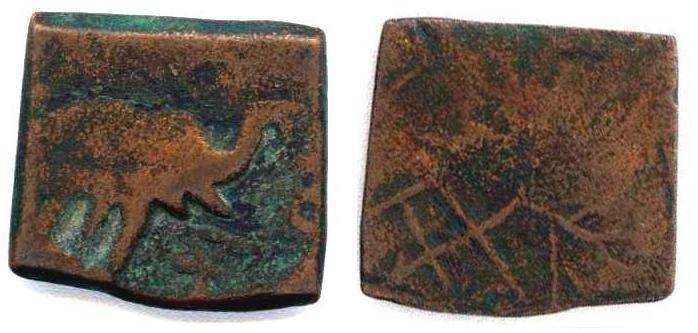
A coin from Nashik

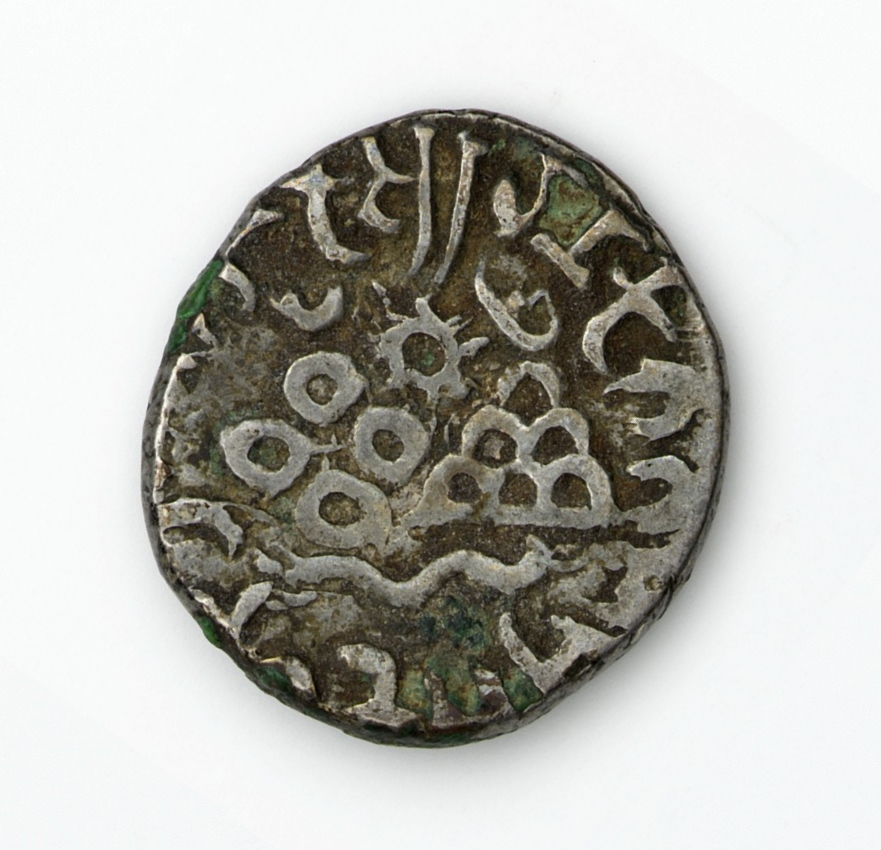
A silver coin, perhaps of Gautamiputra Satakarni (side 1)

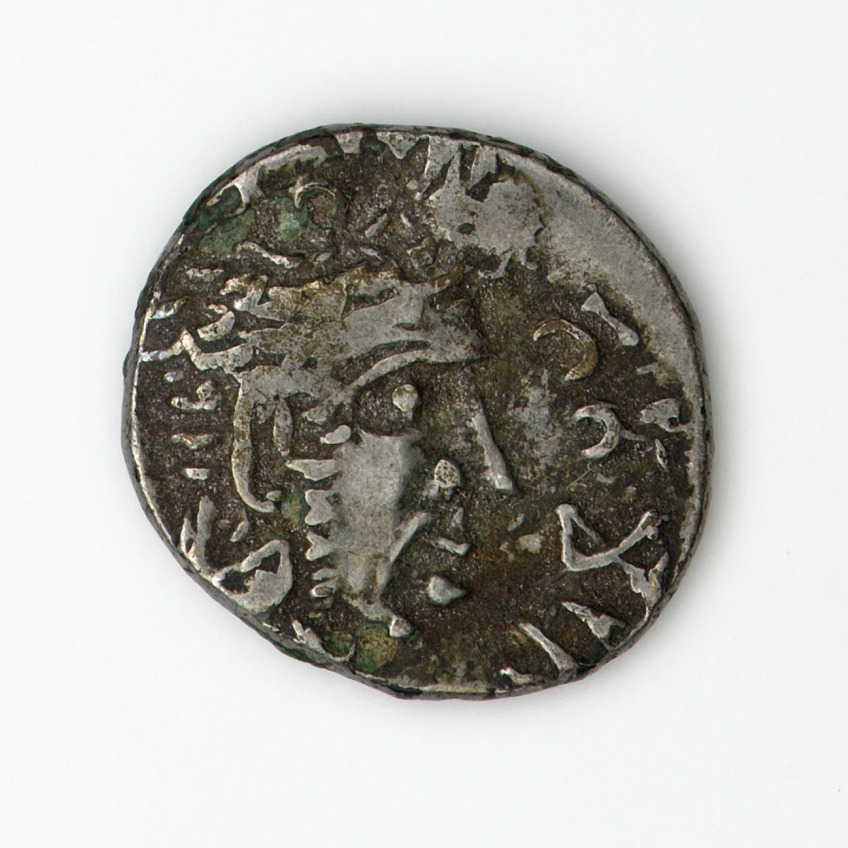
A silver coin, perhaps of Gautamiputra Satakarni (side 2)

== Last years ==
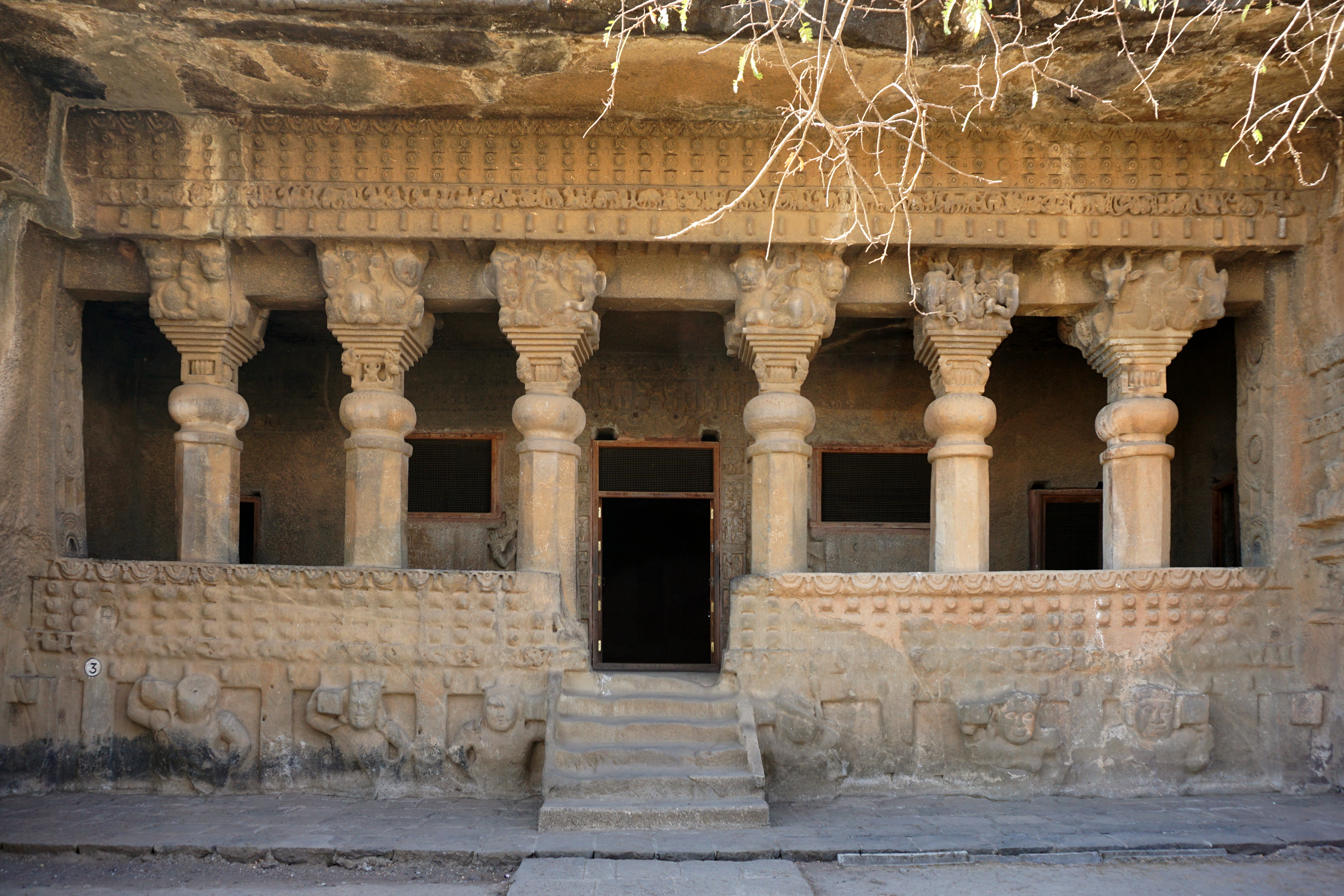
Cave No.3 at the Pandavleni Caves in Nashik was probably started during the reign of Gautamiputra Satakarni, and was finished and dedicated to the Buddhist Samgha during the reign of his son Vasishthiputra Pulumavi.

According to the Matsya Purana and the Vayu Purana, Gautamiputra ruled for 21 years. However, an inscription dated to his 24th regnal year has been found at the Nashik cave. The inscription mentions his mother as jiva-suta ("having a living son"). D. C. Sircar interpreted this to mean that the king was ill, and the term jiva-suta was intended to assure the people that the king was alive, while his mother ran the administration. Shailendra Nath Sen also speculated that the king might have been assisted by his mother in administration because of his illness or military preoccupation. V. V. Mirashi dismissed Sircar's theory as "ridiculous", arguing that jiva-suta is an expression used in several ancient sources and simply emphasizes the good fortune of a woman. Sudhakar Chattopadhyaya also criticizes Sircar's interpretation, pointing out that the first line in the inscription refers to the king's order. He adds that jiva-suta is simply an "affectionate expression of a mother", and should not be over-analyzed.

D. R. Bhandarkar and R. G. Bhandarkar believed that Gautamiputra and his son Vasishthiputra Pulumavi ruled jointly during the last years of his reign. This theory is based on their interpretations of the various Satavahana inscriptions. In Nashik prashasti, Gautami Balashri calls herself the mother of the great king as well as the grandmother of the great king, indicating that both were kings at that time. There are also indications that Gautamiputra was alive, when this inscription was issued in the 19th regnal year of his son. Despite this, the inscription describes the achievements of Gautamiputra Satakarni, but remains silent about the exploits of his son. Based on these arguments, Bhandarkar speculated that Gautamiputra ruled eastern Deccan, while Vasishthiputra ruled western Deccan. This theory has been dismissed by several other scholars, including K. A. Nilakanta Sastri and H. C. Raychaudhuri. G.J. Dubreuil theorizes that the excavation of the cave (where this inscription was found) began during the reign of Gautamiputra. However, the work was finished only after his death, and the inscription was placed on his behalf by his mother, during the reign of his son. Bhandarkar's theory is further weakened by the fact that there is clear historical evidence of Gautamiputra's rule over western Deccan. Moreover, no inscriptions issued jointly by the father-son duo are available.

It is possible that by the end of his reign, Gautamiputra lost some of his territory to the Kardamakas, a Western Kshatrapa dynasty that succeeded Nahapana's Kshaharata dynasty. The Junagadh inscription of the Kardamaka ruler Rudradaman I states that he defeated Satakarni, the lord of Dakshinapatha (Deccan), twice. It also states that he spared the life of the defeated ruler because of close relations. "Satakarni" is a title common to several Satavahana kings. According to D. R. Bhandarkar and Dineshchandra Sircar, the ruler defeated by Rudradaman was Gautamiputra Satakarni. However, E. J. Rapson believed that the defeated ruler was his son and successor Vasishthiputra Pulumavi. Shailendra Nath Sen and Charles Higham believe that the defeated ruler was Vashishtiputra's successor Shivaskanda or Shiva Sri Pulumayi (or Pulumavi).

== Administration ==
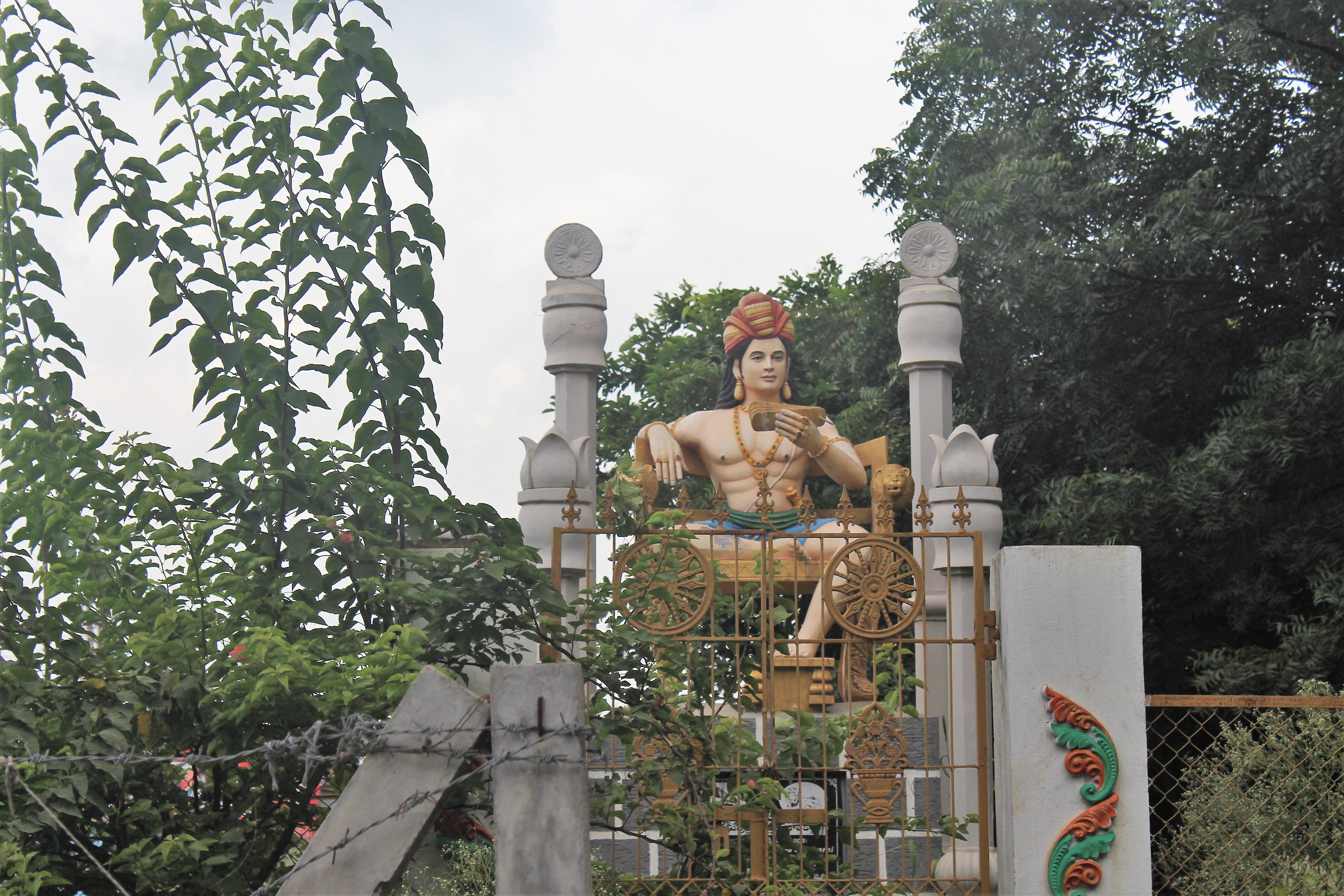
Gautami Putra Satkarni Statue in Amaravathi

The location of Gautamiputra's capital is uncertain. In the Nashik inscription dated to his 18th regnal year, he is described as the "Lord of Benakataka". Carla M. Sinopoli identifies Benakataka as a place in the Nashik region. V. V. Mirashi identified it with Pauni Bhandara district.

The inscriptions of Gautamiputra Satakarni indicate that his empire was divided into units known as āhāras. Each āharā was governed by an amātya or amaca. Three types of settlements are named in the inscriptions: nagara (city), nigama (town) and gama (village).

The Nashik prashasti inscription calls him ekabrahmana. One interpretation of this word is "a peerless Brahmin" or "a staunch Brahmin", since the same inscription also states that he destroyed the haughtiness of other Kshatriyas. However, this term has also been interpreted differently as "the only protector of the Brahmins" or "a proud champion of Brahmanism". Nevertheless, the king also patronized Buddhist monks. According to one of his Nashik inscriptions, the monks were exempted from taxes and granted immunity from any interference by the royal officers.

The Nashik prashasti also states that the king's joys and sorrows were the same as those of his citizens. It claims that he did not like to destroy life, even that of the enemies who offended him. The edict compares him to legendary heroes such as Rama, Keshava, Arjuna, Bhimasena, Nabhaga, Nahusha, Janamejaya, Sagara, Yayati and Ambarisha.

He exchanged land grant of Kakhadi with one hundred nivartanas of land in Govardhana to the ascetics.

== In popular culture ==
Gautamiputra Satakarni, a Telugu language film directed by Krish and featuring Nandamuri Balakrishna in the titular role, was released on 12 January 2017.

Preceded by Sivasvati	Satavahana Ruler; 2nd century CE	Succeeded by Vasishthiputra Pulumavi
