= Sudarshana Lake =

Artificial lake in Gujarat, India

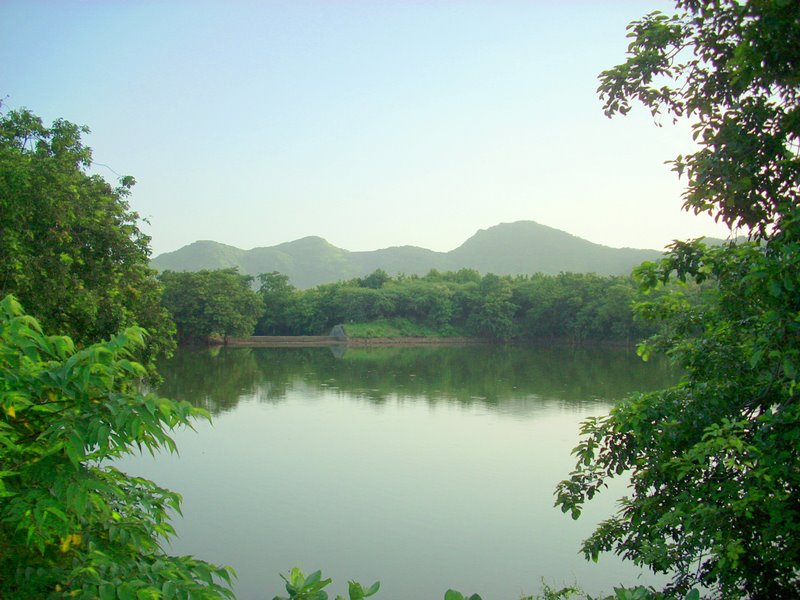
- Interactive map of Sudarshana Lake
- Location: Bhavnath, Girnar, Gujarat
- Coordinates: 21.5272°N 70.5035°E
- Lake type: Man-made lake
- Settlements: Girnar

Sudarshana Lake is an artificial lake located in the semi-arid region of Kathiawar. The lake was originally commissioned by Chandragupta Maurya and later renovated by several kings across different dynasties.

== History ==
Sudarshana Lake was originally constructed by Pushyagupta, a governor under the Maurya emperor Chandragupta Maurya (c. 320–297 BCE). The lake was built as part of a water conservation project in the semi-arid region of Kathiawar, now Gujarat. Later, during the reign of Ashoka (c. 268–232 BCE), the lake underwent renovations by Tushaspha, a governor appointed by Ashoka.

Sudarshana Lake, an ancient water conservation project in Junagadh of Gujarat. The lake was constructed by Chandragupta Maurya and underwent renovations by other three ruler including Ashoka, Rudradaman I, and Skandagupta.

The lake suffered damage in the 2nd century CE due to heavy rains, which led to a breach in the dam. In 150 CE, Rudradaman I, a king of the Western Kshatrapas, undertook a major renovation as recorded in the Junagadh Rock Inscription of Rudradaman. The lake was also repaired by Suvisakha, a Parthian governor under Rudradaman.

(L.8)... for the sake of ordered to be made by the Vaishya Pushyagupta, the provincial governor of the Maurya king Chandragupta Maurya; adorned with conduits for Ashoka the Maurya by the Yavana king Tushaspha while governing; and by the conduit ordered to be made by him, constructed in a manner worthy of a king (and) seen in that breach, the extensive dam.

—Junagadh rock inscription of Rudradaman

The lake was also restored by Chakrapalita, the son of Parnadatta, the governor of Saurashtra under King Skandagupta. Chakrapalita repaired the breach and rebuilt the embankment—100 cubits long, 68 cubits wide, and as tall as seven men—in just two months.

Junagadh rock inscription
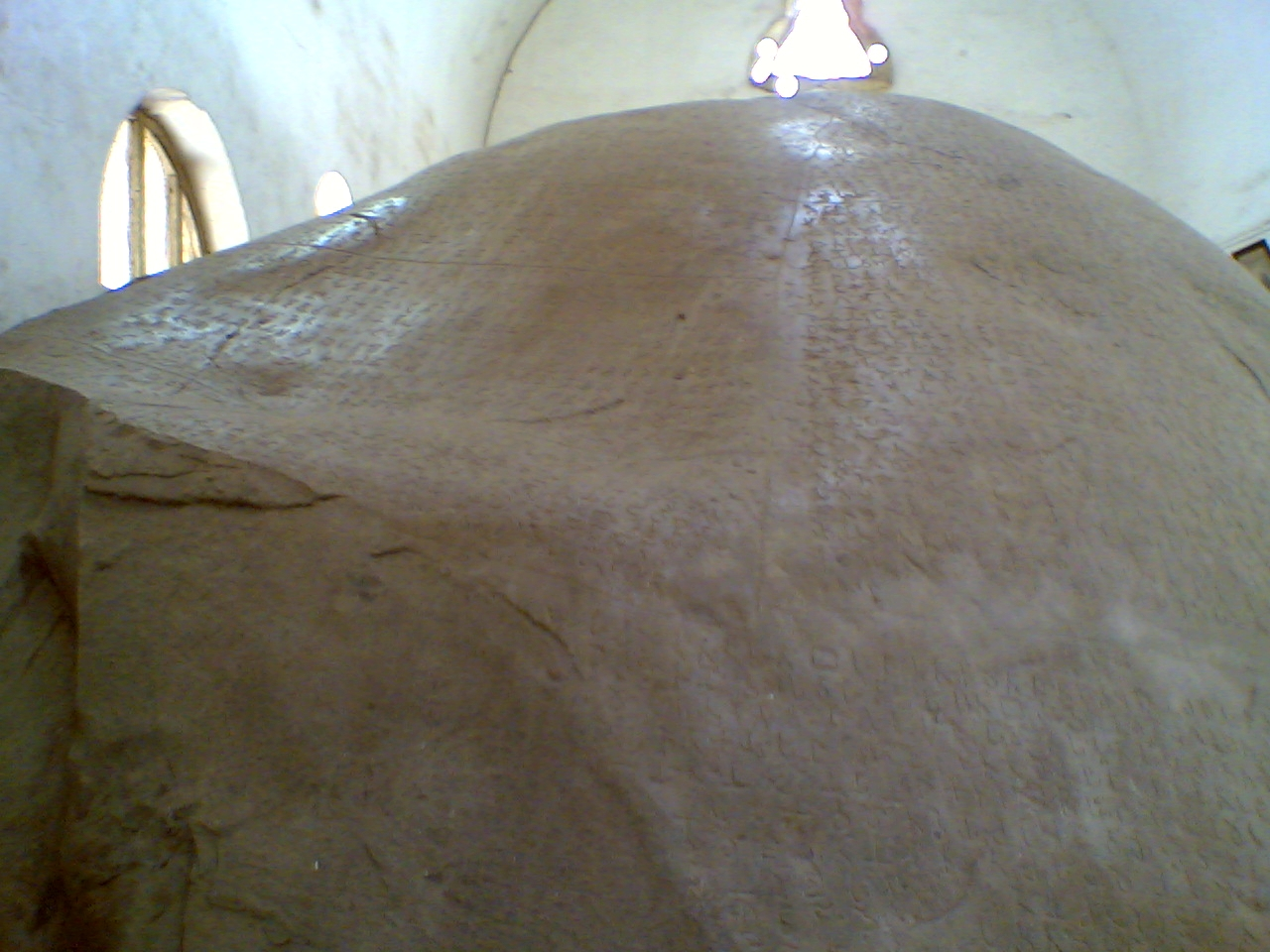
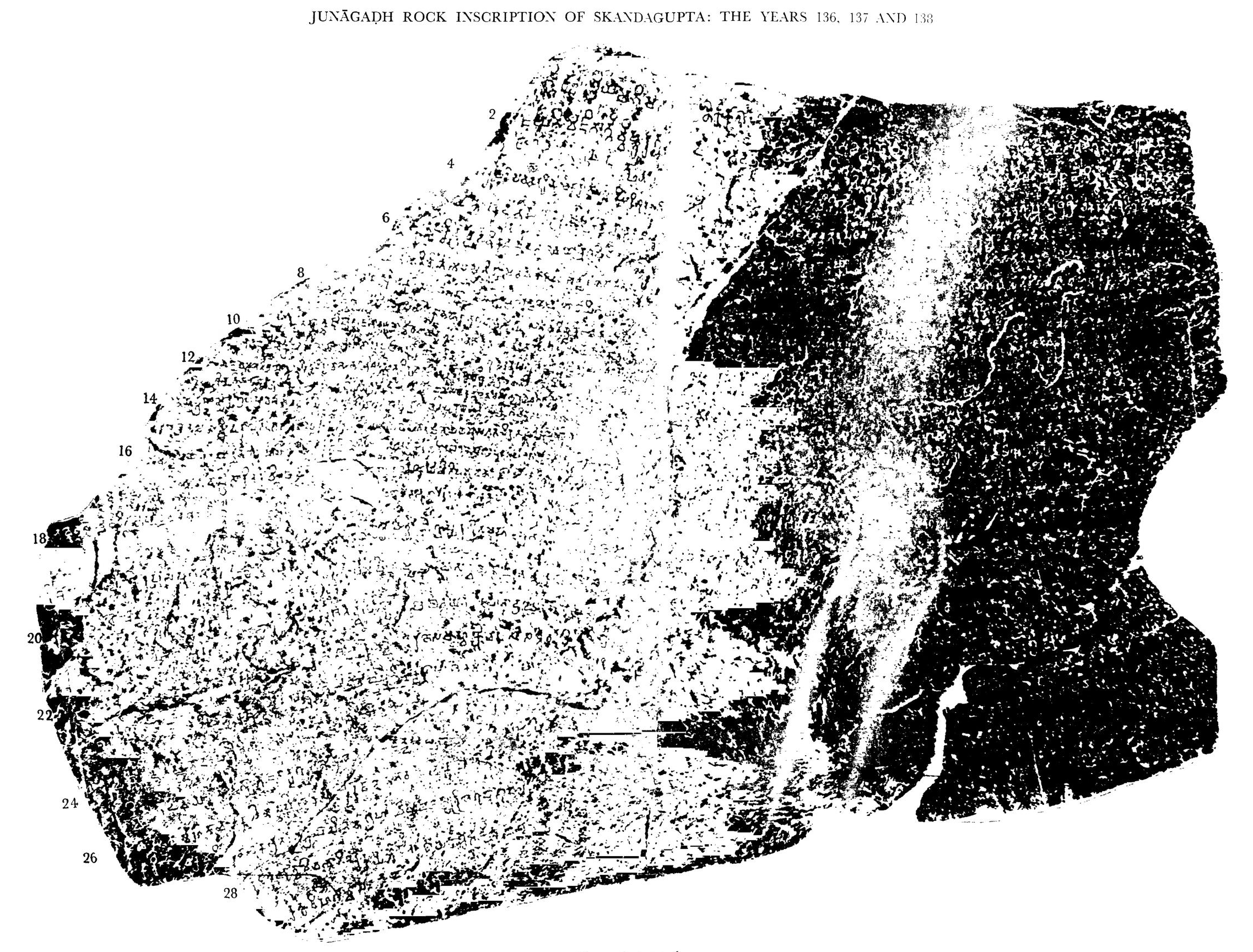
The Junagadh rock in Girnar mountain contains an inscription of Skandagupta, besides those of the earlier kings Ashoka and Rudradaman I.

== Architecture ==
Sudarshana Lake has an elaborate system of channels and conduits that were constructed to direct water into the lake. The embankment of the lake was reportedly 100 cubits long, 68 cubits wide, and 7 cubits high.

== See also ==
- Tushaspha
- Junagadh rock inscription of Rudradaman
- Saurashtra
- Western Satraps
