= Uttamabhadras =

Ancient Indian tribe described in the Mahabharata

The Uttamabhadras are an ancient Indian tribe described in the Mahabharata and later inscriptions.

The Uttamabhadras lived in the Punjab. Uttamabhadras originally were people of Balkh who had entered India in Vedic times. In Vedic times, they were closely related to Kurus and the Purus. In Kurukshetra War, we also find Madras associated with the Kurus. King Shalya had taken part in the Mahabharata War, on behalf of the Kauravas. Madri, the mother of Pandava-putras Nakula and Sahadeva, was a Madra princess. Madri has also been referred to as Bahliki i.e. princess of Bahlika janapada/tribe and king Salya has been referred to as Bahlika-pungava i.e. foremost among the Bahlikas. Epic also refers to king Ashvapati of Madra, the beloved of the Paura Janapadas, who was father of Savitri. King Vyusitashva was a descendant of Puru, a famous king of Rigvedic times.

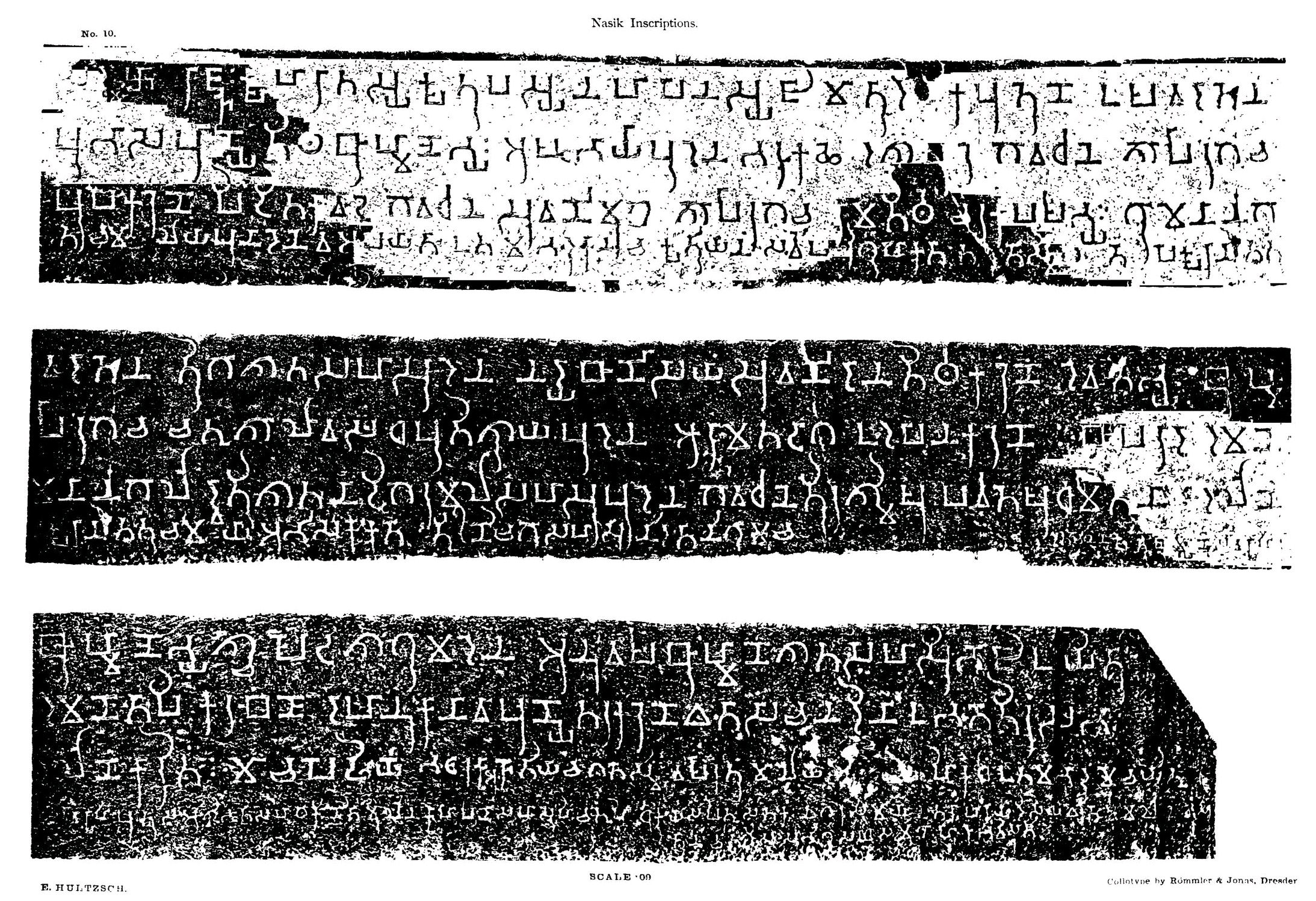
Nasik Cave inscription No.10. of Ushavadata describing the rescue of the Uttamabhadras, Cave No.10.

Circa 120 CE, the Uttamabhadras are mentioned as allies of the Western Satraps in repulsing an attack by the Malavas, whom they crushed. The claim appears in an inscription at the Nashik Caves, made by the Nahapana's viceroy Ushavadata:

...And by order of the lord I went to release the chief of the Uttamabhadras, who had been besieged for the rainy season by the Malayas, and those Malayas fled at the mere roar (of my approaching) as it were, and were all made prisoners of the Uttamabhadra warriors.

— Inscription in Cave No.10 of the Nashik Caves.
