= Junagadh rock inscription of Rudradaman =

Inscriptions in India

Jungadh rock inscription of Rudradaman I
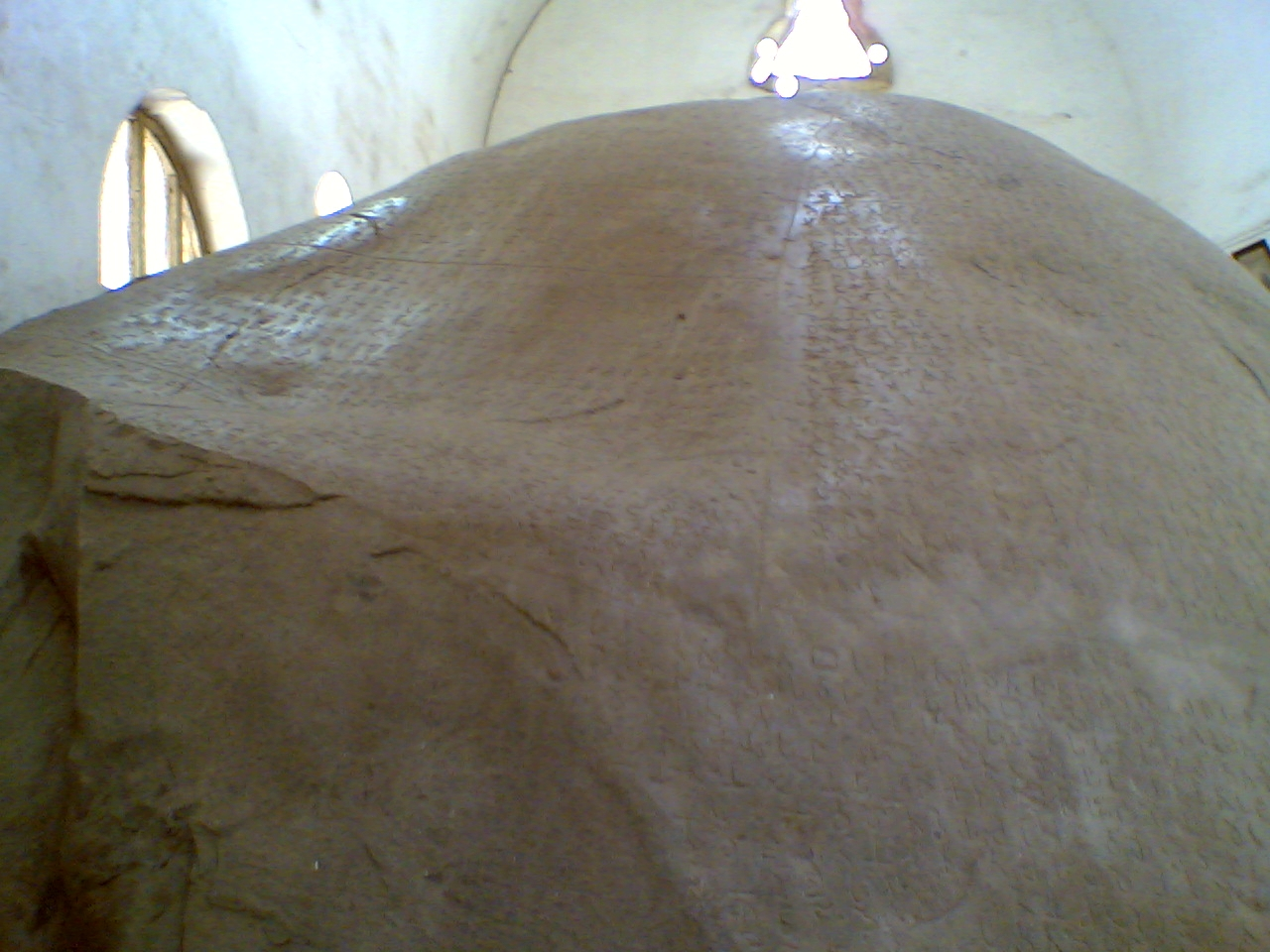
- The inscribed rock
- Writing: Sanskrit, Brahmi script
- Created: circa 150 AD
- Place: Junagadh, Gujarat
- Present location: near Girnar mountain

Location
- Rudadaman inscription rock (India)

The Junagadh rock inscription of Rudradaman, also known as the Girnar Rock inscription of Rudradaman, is a Sanskrit prose inscribed on a rock by the Western Satraps ruler Rudradaman I. It is located near Girnar hill near Junagadh, Gujarat, India. The inscription is dated to shortly after 150 CE. The Junagadh rock contains inscriptions of one (of fourteen) the Major Rock Edicts of the Mauryan emperor Ashoka, as well as inscriptions from the Saka ruler Rudradaman I and Skandagupta of the Gupta Empire.

== Description ==
The inscription is found on a major rock to the east of the town of Junagadh in Kathiawar region of Gujarat, India. It is near the base of the Girnar mountain. The Rudradaman inscription is one of the three significant inscriptions found on the rock, dated to be the second in chronology. The oldest inscription is a version of Ashoka edicts, while the last and third inscription is of Skandagupta. The Rudradaman inscription is near the top, above the Ashoka edict. It is dated to shortly after 150 CE.

The inscription has twenty lines, of different lengths spread over about 5.5 feet high and 11 feet wide. The first sixteen lines are extensively damaged in parts and are incomplete, with evidence suggesting willful damage as well as natural rock peeling. The lost text constitutes about 15 percent of the total text. The last four are complete and in a good state of preservation. According to Kielhorn, the alphabet is an earlier form of the "decidedly southern alphabet" of those found later in Gupta Empire and inscriptions of Skandagupta. The inscribed characters are about 7/8 inches in height. The first eight lines offer a historical record of water management and irrigation conduits at the Sudarshana Lake from the era of Chandragupta Maurya (321-297 BCE) to the time when the inscription was written around 150 CE. The last twelve lines praise king Rudradaman I (literally, "garland of Rudra").

The inscription is in Sanskrit language and entirely in prose. The text is generally in good standard classical Sanskrit but reflects much that is non-standard Sanskrit, according to Kielhorn. For example, it disregards the sandhi rules of the Sanskrit language "no less than 10 times", but some of these may have been "mere clerical errors". The text also has an "extreme dearth of verbal forms", states Kielhorn, a form that mirrors the classical prose writing style of the early era. According to Salomon, noting Kielhorn and Renou's observations, "the language of the Junagadh inscription is not pure classical Sanskrit in the strictest sense of the term" and its orthography too is inconsistent about anusvara, visarga, notation of double consonants and the ḷ retroflex. These and other errors may reflect an influence of the less formal epic-vernacular style and the local dialect features, states Salomon. Nevertheless, beyond disregarding some of "the grammatical niceties of Paninian/classical Sanskrit", the inscription does closely approach the classical Sanskrit norms.

== Inscription ==
James Prinsep, known for his work with the Brahmi script, first edited and translated this inscription in April 1838. It thereafter attracted a series of visits, revisions and scholarly publications, including those by Lassen, Wilson, Fleet and the significant work of Bhagvanlal Indraji and Bhau Daji in 1862. The edition and interpretation published by Bhau Daji was reviewed and revised further by Eggeling with collotype estampages by Burgess. Kielhorn's translation was published in the Epigraphia Indica Volume VIII, and the translation below is based on it.

=== Translation ===
Junagadh rock inscription of Rudradaman
English translation

(Be it) accomplished!

(Line l.) This lake Sudarshana, from Girinagara [even a long distance?] .. of a structure so well joined as to rival the spur of a mountain, because all its embankments are strong, in breadth, length and height constructed without gaps as they are of stone, [clay], . furnished with a natural dam, [formed by?].., and with well-provided conduits, drains and means to guard against foul matter,three sectionsby.............and other favours is (now) in an excellent condition.

(L. 3.) This same (lake) -on the first of the dark half of Margashirsha in the seventy-second -72nd - year of the king, the Mahakshatrapa Rudradaman whose name is repeated by the venerable, the son of . . . . . . . . . . . . , (and) son's son of the king, the Mahakshatrapa Lord Chashtana the taking of whose name is auspicious,. when by the clouds pouring with rain the earth had been converted as it were into one ocean, by the excessively swollen floods of the Suvarnasikata, Palasini and other streams of mount Urjayat the dam , though proper precautions [were taken], the water- churned by a storm which, of a most tremendous fury befitting the end of a mundane period, tore down hill-tops, trees, banks, turrets, upper stories, gates and raised places of shelter - scattered, broke to pieces, [tore apart].. ., -with stones, trees, bushes and creeping plants scattered about, was thus laid open down to the bottom of the river:-

(L. 7.) By a breach four hundred and twenty cubits long, just as many broad, (and) seventy-five cubits deep, all the water escaped, so that (the lake), almost like a sandy desert, [became] extremely ugly [to look at].

(L.8) for the sake of/ ordered to be made by the Vaishya Pushyagupta, the provincial governor of the Maurya king Chandragupta; adorned with conduits for Ashoka the Maurya by the Yavana king Tushaspha while governing; and by the conduit ordered to be made by him, constructed in a manner worthy of a king (and) seen in that breach, the extensive dam...

(L. 9.) ..he who, because from the womb he was distinguished by the possession of undisturbed consummate Royal Fortune, was resorted to by all castes and chosen their lord to protect them; who made, and is true to, the vow to the latest breath of his life to abstain from slaying men, except in battles; who [showed] compassion not failing to deal blows to equal antagonists meeting him face to face; who grants protection of life to people repairing to him of their own accord and those prostrating themselves before him;

...who is the lord of the whole of eastern and western Akaravanti (Akara: East Malwa and Avanti: West Malwa), the Anupa country, Anarta, Surashtra, Svabhra (northern Gujarat) Maru (Marwar), Kachchha (Cutch), Sindhu-Sauvira (Sindh and Multan districts), Kukura (Eastern Rajputana), Aparanta ("Western Border" - Northern Konkan), Nishada (a tribe, Malwa and parts of Central India) and other territories gained by his own valour, the towns, marts and rural parts of which are never troubled by robbers, snakes, wild beasts, diseases and the like, where all subjects are attached to him, (and) where through his might the objects of [religion], wealth and pleasure [are duly attained];

...who by force destroyed the Yaudheyas who were loath to submit, rendered proud as they were by having manifested their' title of' heroes among all Kshatriyas; who obtained good report because he, in spite of having twice in fair fight completely defeated Satakarni, the lord of Dakshinapatha, on account of the nearness of their connection did not destroy him; who [obtained] victory . . . . . . . .; who reinstates deposed kings;

...who by the right raising of his hand has earned the strong attachment of Dharma; who has attained wide fame by studying and remembering, by the knowledge and practice of, grammar, music, logic and other great sciences; who the management of horses, elephants and chariots, (the use of) sword and shield, pugilistic combat and other . .. . . . the acts of quickness and efficiency of opposing forces; who day by day is in the habit of bestowing presents and honours and eschewing disrespectful treatment; who is bounteous; whose treasury by the tribute, tolls and shares rightfully obtained overflows with an accumulation of gold, silver, diamonds, beryl stones and (other) precious things; who........... prose and verse, which are clear, agreeable, sweet, charming, beautiful, excelling by the proper use of words and adorned; whose beautiful frame owns the most excellent marks and signs, such as (auspicious) length, dimension and height, voice, gait, colour, vigour and strength; who himself has acquired the name of Mahakshatrapa; who has been wreathed with many garlands at the svayamvaras of kings' daughters; -he, the Mahakshatrapa Rudradaman, in order to . . . . . . . . . . . cows and Brahmans for a thousand of years, and to increase his religious merit and fame, -without oppressing the inhabitants of the towns and country by taxes, forced labour and acts of affection -by (the expenditure of) a vast amount of money from his own treasury and in not too long a time made the dam three times as strong in breadth and length . . . . . . . . [on] all [banks] . . . . . . (and so) had (this lake) made (even) more beautiful to look at.

(L. 16.) When in this matter the Mahakshatrapa's counsellors and executive officers, who though fully endowed with the qualifications of ministers, were averse to a task (regarded as) futile on account of the enormous extent of the breach, opposed the commencement (of the work), (and) when the people in their despair of having the dam rebuilt were loudly lamenting, (the work) was carried out by the minister Suvishakha, the son of Kulaipa, a Pahlava, who for the benefit of the inhabitants of the towns and country bad been appointed by the king in this government to rule the whole of Anarta and Surashtra, (a minister) who by his proper dealings and views in things temporal and spiritual increased the attachment (of the people), who was able, patient, not wavering, not arrogant, upright (and) not to be bribed, (and) who by his good government increased the spiritual merit, fame and glory of his master.

— Junagadh rock inscription of Rudradaman

== Significance ==
The inscription is significant as a historical record of public works in ancient India, nearly 500 years before the inscription was created. It mentions the construction of a water reservoir named Sudarshana nearby, during the reign of the Maurya Empire founder Chandragupta Maurya by Vaishya Pushyagupta. Later, during the reign of Ashoka, it mentions a Yavana king named Tushaspha building conduits. According to Dilip Chakrabarti, a professor of South Asian archaeology at the Cambridge University, the inscription is an evidence of historical record keeping tradition in ancient India because Rudradaman otherwise would not have known the names of people involved in the project in 4th-century BCE, or who later worked on the water reservoir in following centuries, before Rudradaman promoted his Sanskrit inscription in 150 CE.

The Junagadh rock inscription also highlights a eulogy-style Sanskrit from the 2nd-century. It is the first long inscription in fairly standard Sanskrit that has survived into the modern era. According to Salomon, the inscription "represents a turning point in the history of epigraphic Sanskrit. This is the first long inscription recorded entirely in more or less standard Sanskrit, as well as the first extensive record in the poetic style. Although further specimens of such poetic prasastis in Sanskrit are not found until the Gupta era, from a stylistic point of view Rudradaman's inscription is clearly their prototype". The Western Satraps successors of Rudradaman, however, were not influenced by this inscription's literary style, but preferred a less formal hybrid Sanskrit language.

The inscription also is significant in recording that the modern era town of Junagadh has ancient roots and it was known as Girinagara in the 2nd-century CE. The mountain Girnar used to be called Urjayat then.

== Gallery ==
The inscription of Rudradaman, its rubbings and coins

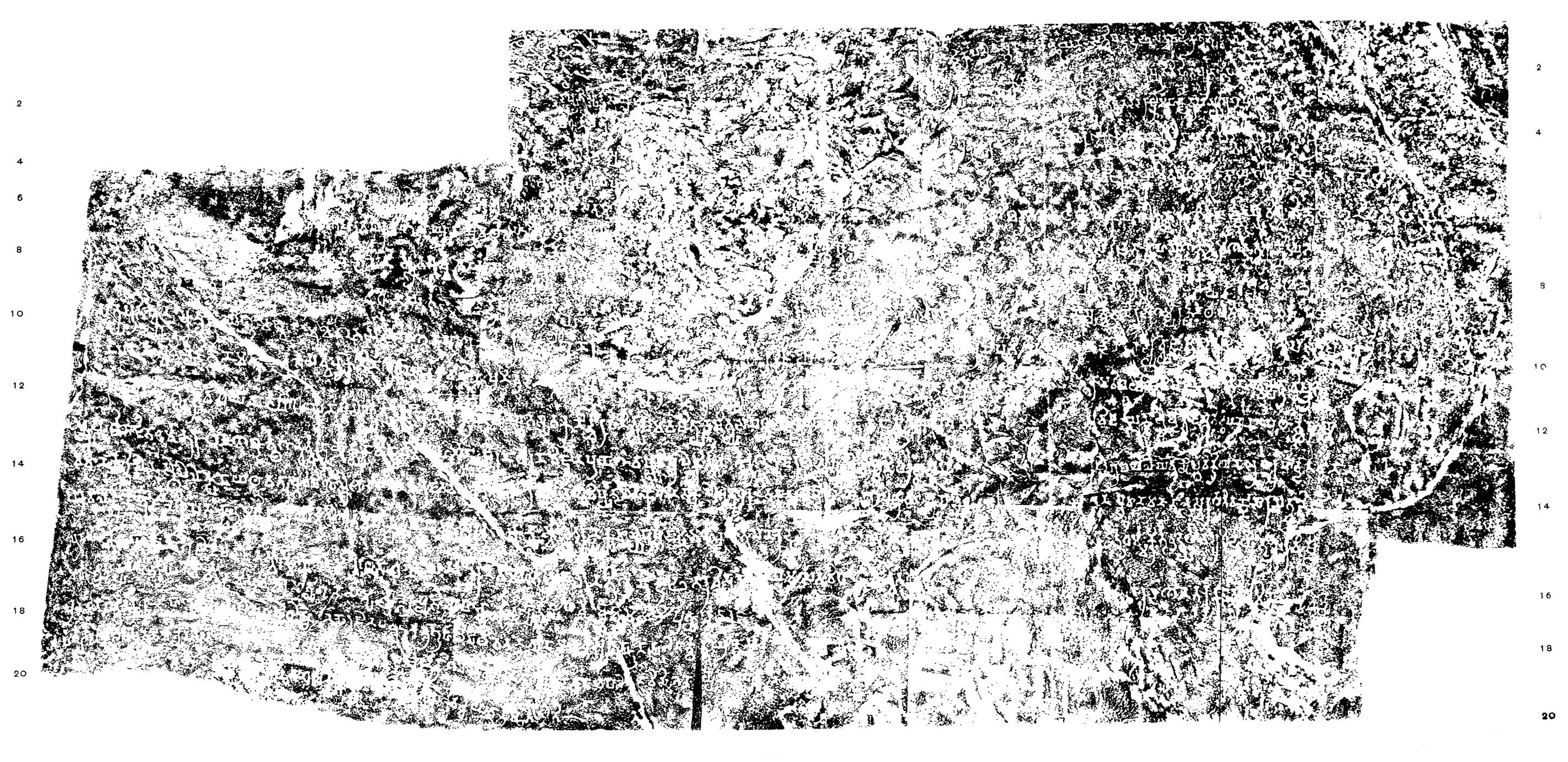
Complete rubbing

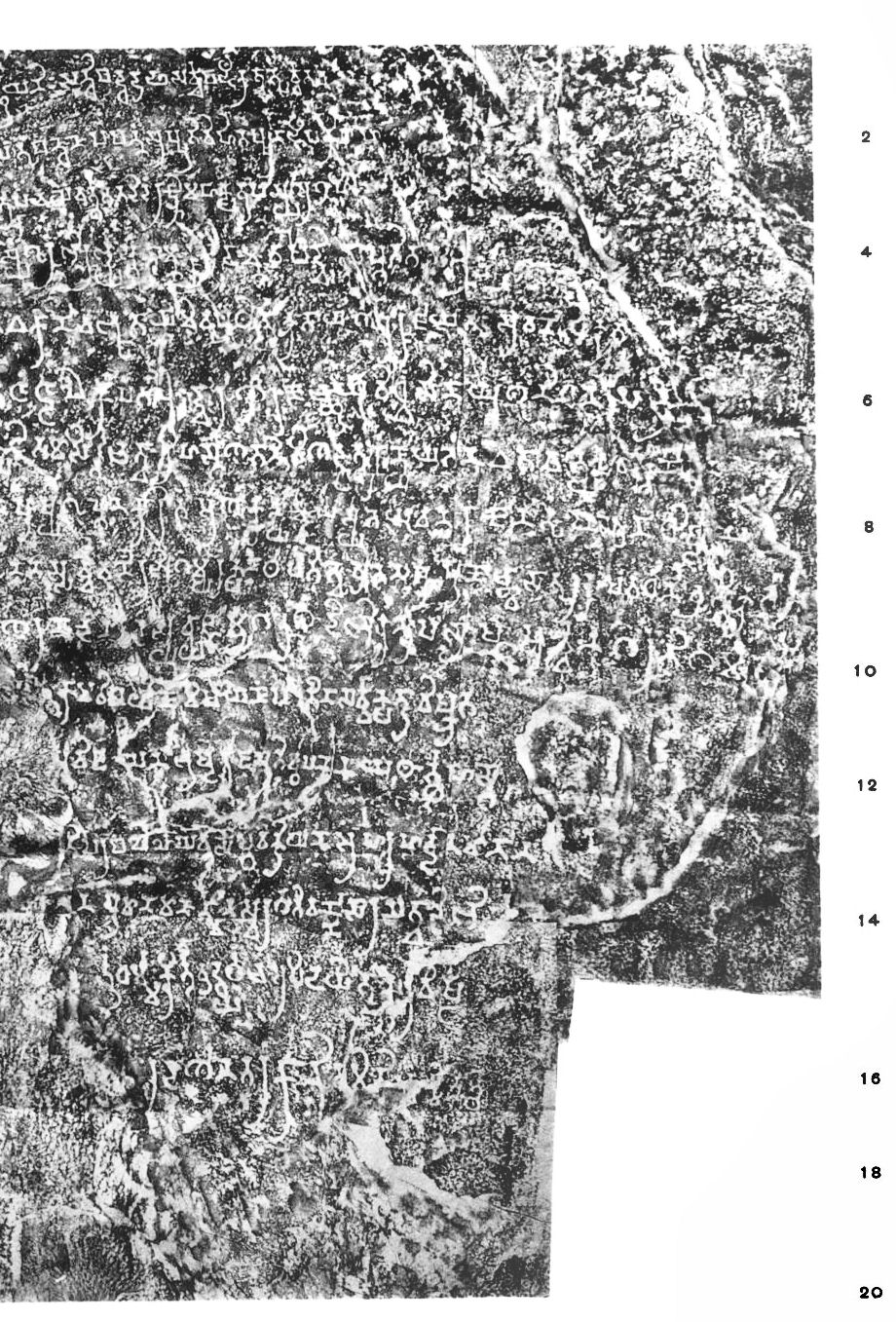
The right portion

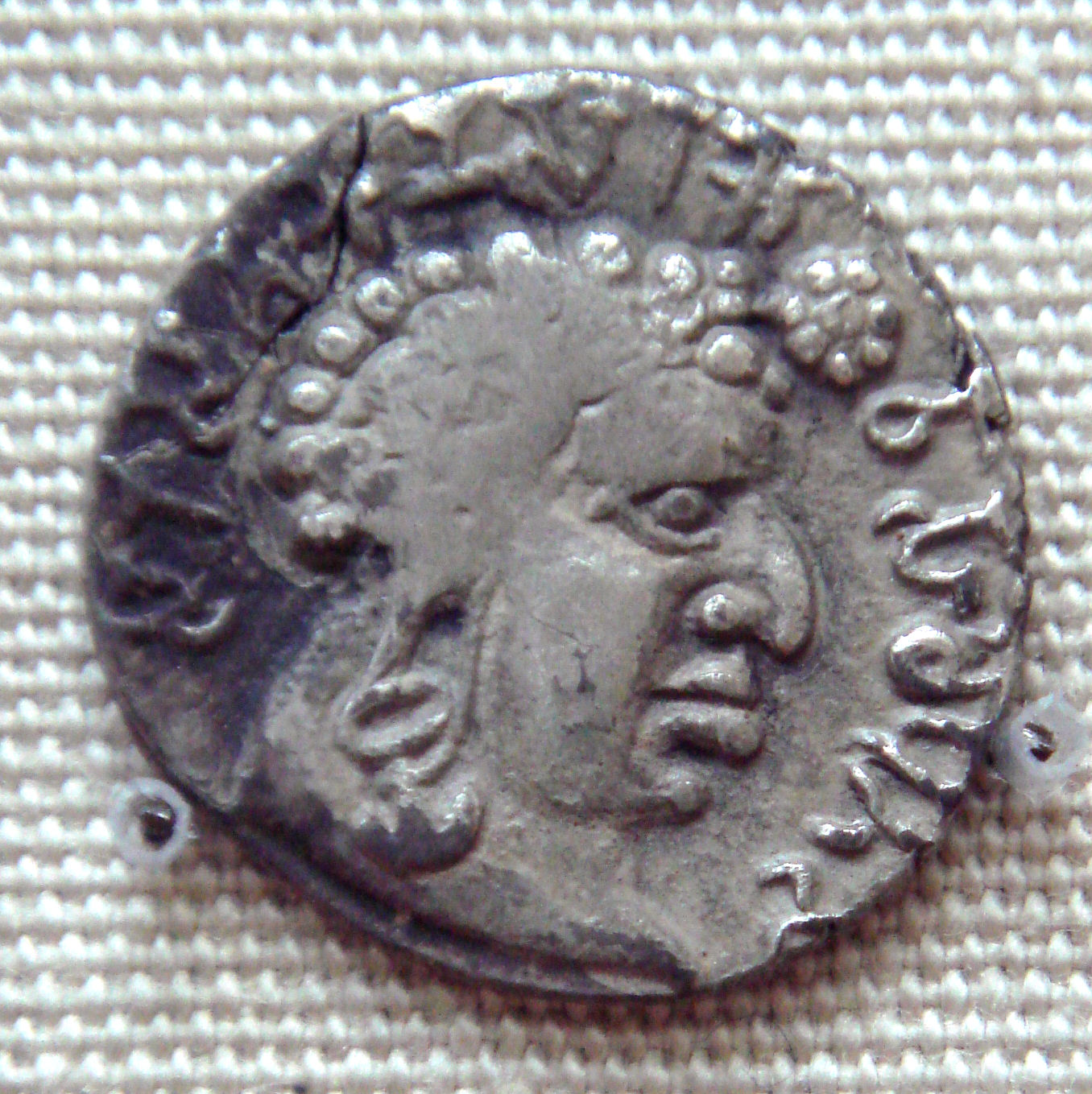
Silver coin of Vashishtiputra Satakarni, defeated by Rudradaman I.

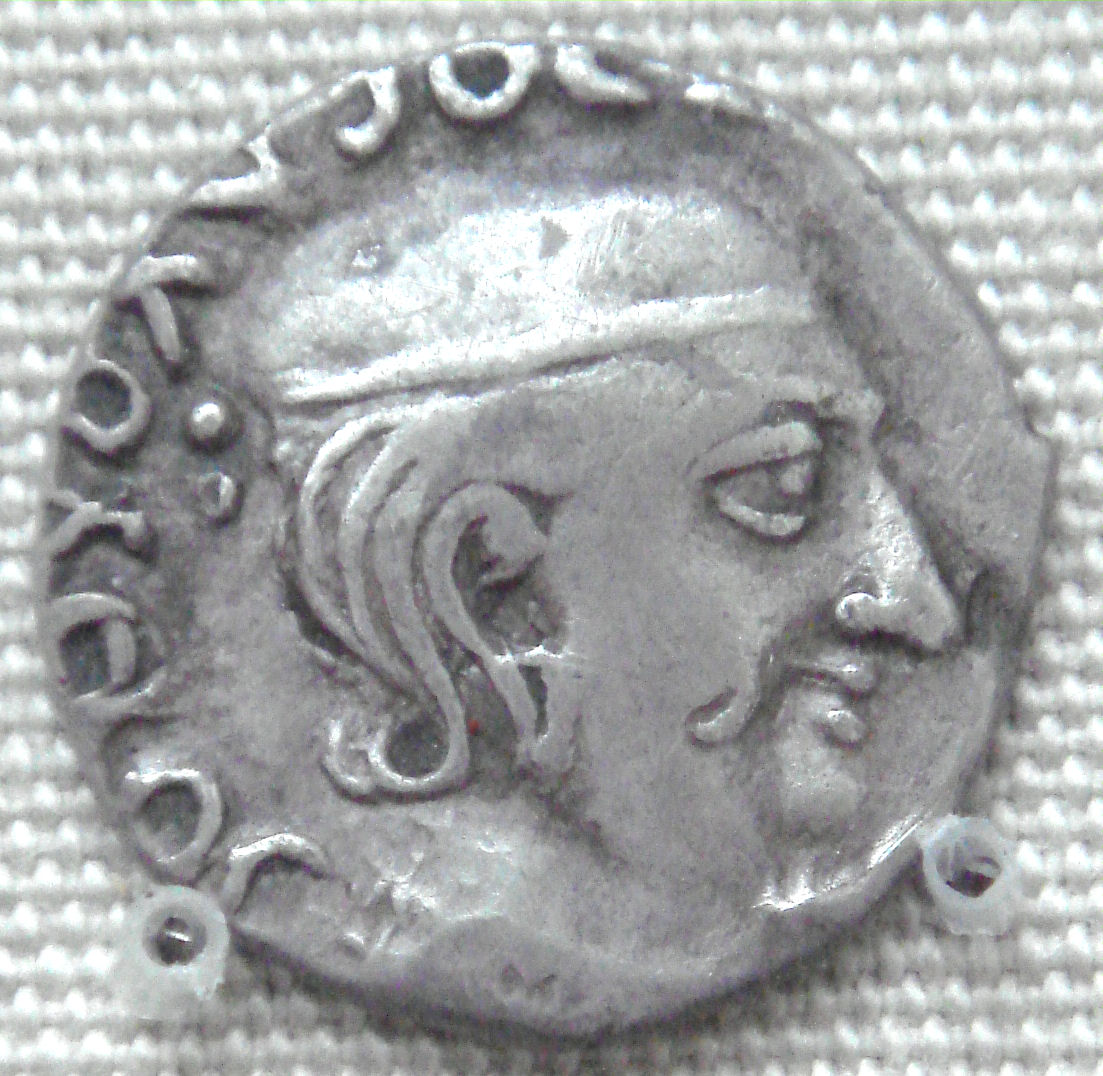
Rudradaman I coin, with corrupted Greek legend, at the British Museum.

== See also ==
- Hathibada Ghosundi Inscriptions
- Nanaghat inscription
- Vasu Doorjamb Inscription
- Sudarshana Lake
