= Ushavadata =

2nd century Western Satrap viceroy

Ushvadata
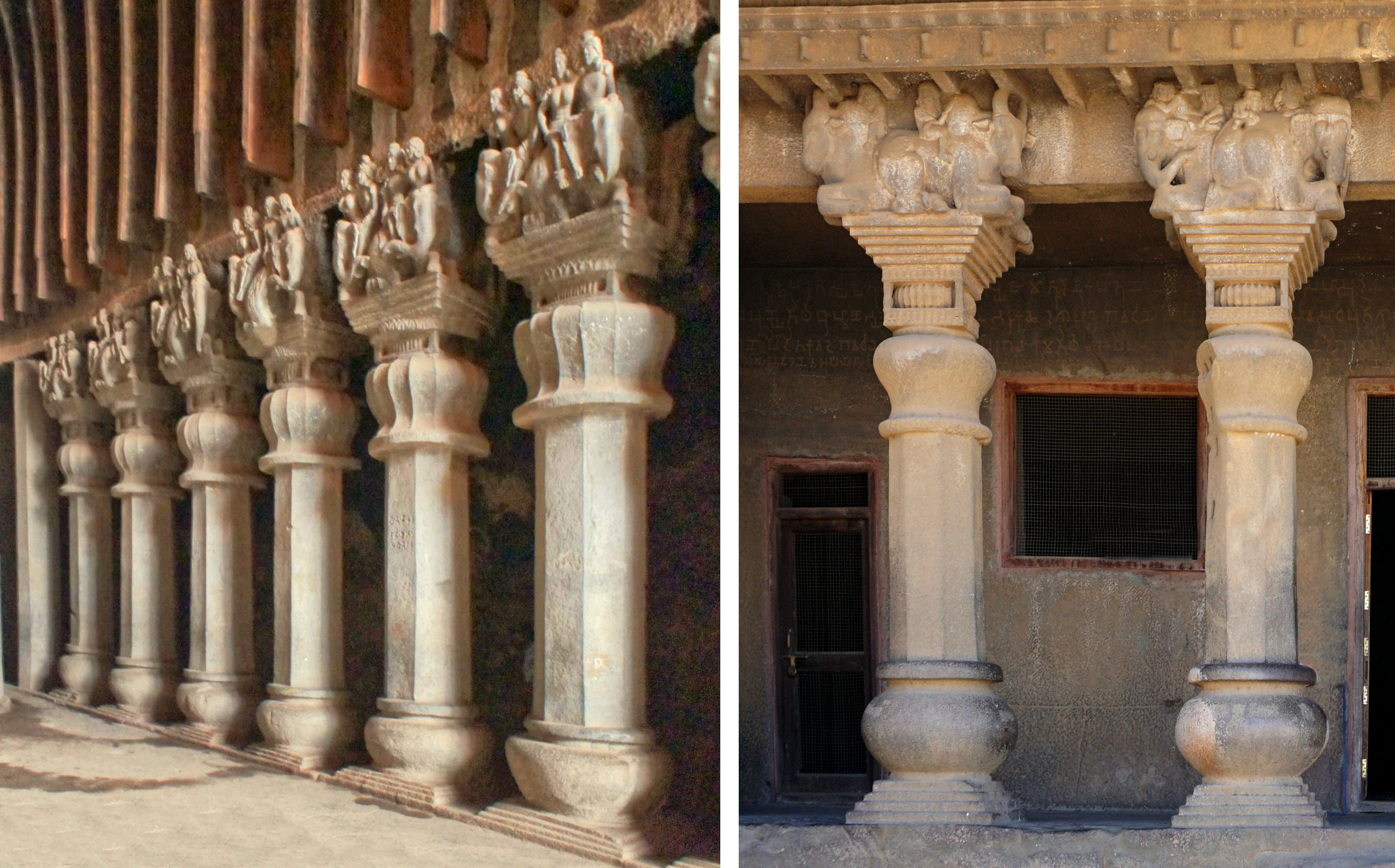
- Born: 2nd century? Western Satrap kingdom
- Died: 2nd century?
- Spouse: Dakshamitra
- Relatives: Dinika (father); Nahapana (father-in-law); Dakshamitra (spouse)
- Military career
- Allegiance: Western Satraps
- Service years: 2nd century
- Commands: Viceroy of southern Saka territories including Nasik, Karle & Junnar.
- Conflicts: Saka-Malava War, Saka-Satavahana Wars

Ushavadata (Brahmi: U-ṣa-va-dā-ta, Uṣavadāta), also known as Rishabhadatta, was a viceroy and son-in-law of the Western Kshatrapa ruler Nahapana, who ruled in western India.

== Name ==
Ushavadata's name is attested in his inscriptions as Uṣavadāta, which is derived from the Saka name *R̥śvadāta, meaning "rightly created".

== Inscriptions ==
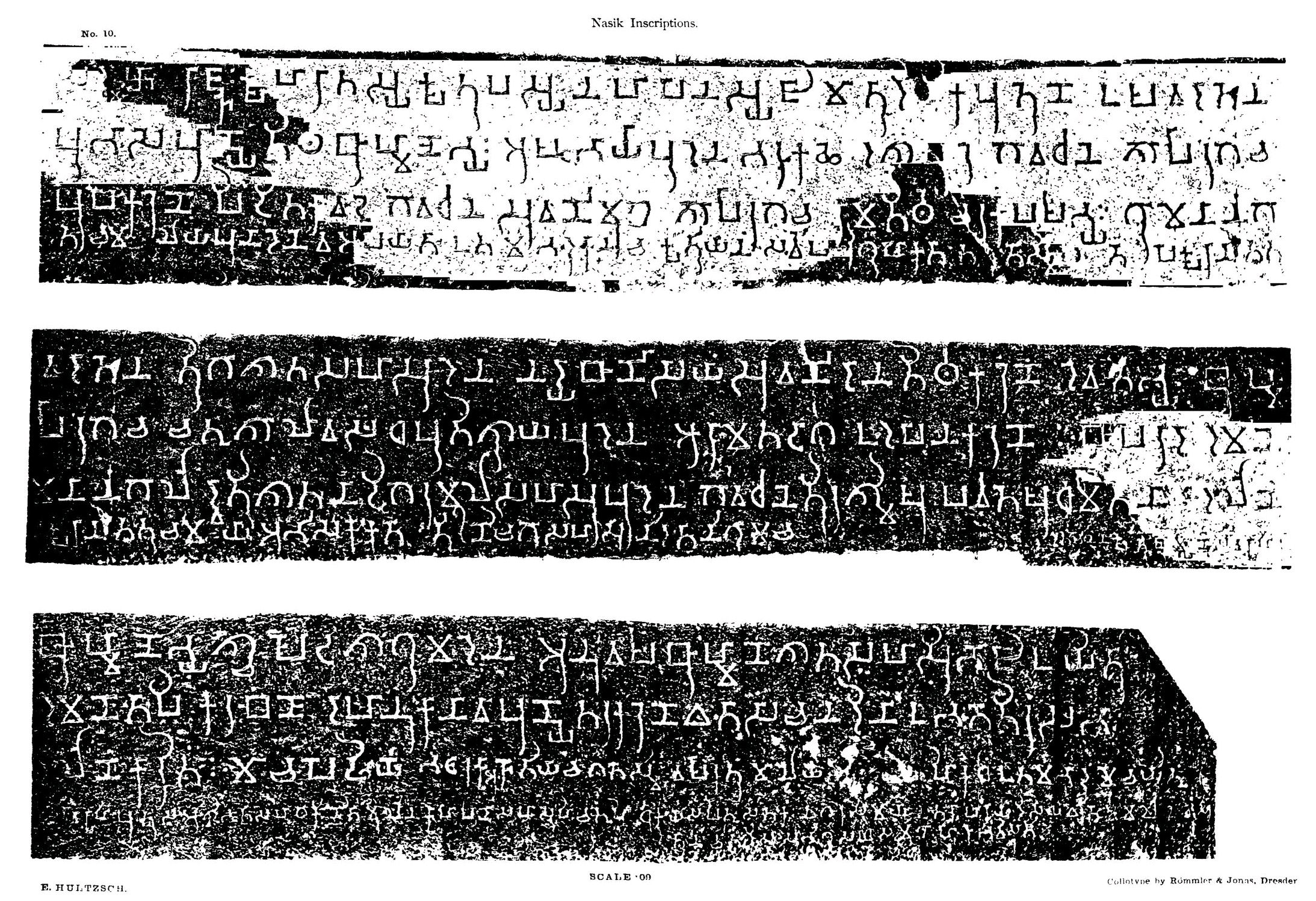
Nasik Cave inscription No.10. of Ushavadata, Cave No.10.

Much of the information about Ushavadata comes from his Nashik and Karle inscriptions. The Nashik inscription contains a eulogy of Ushavadata in Sanskrit, and then records the donation of a cave to Buddhists in a Middle Indo-Aryan language. The Karle inscription contains a similar eulogy, but in the Middle Indo-Aryan language.

== Early life ==
Ushavadata was the son of one Dinika. He identifies as a Shaka (IAST: Śaka) in his Nashik inscription:

"[Success !] By permanent charities of Ushavadata, the Shaka, [son of Dinika], son-in-law of king Nahapana, the [Kshahara]ta Kshatrapa...."

— Inscription No.14a of Nahapana, Cave No.10, Nasik

He believed in the Vedic religion, and married Nahapana's daughter Dakshamitra.

== Charity ==
Both of Ushavadata's inscriptions mention the following of his charitable acts:

- Donated 300,000 cows
- Donated gold for the establishment of a holy site on the banks of the Barnasa river
- Donated 16 villages to the deities and Brahmanas (priests)
- Gave 8 wives to the Brahmanas at the holy site of Prabhasa
- Fed hundreds of thousands of Brahmanas every year

The Nashik inscription records more such acts, stating that Ushavadata exhibited very pious behaviour at the Trirashmi hills, where the Nashik caves are located:

- Donated four-roomed rest houses in Bharukachchha (Bharuch), Dashapura (Mandsaur), Govardhana (near Nashik), and Shurparaka (Nala Sopara)
- Commissioned gardens, tanks, and wells
- Established free crossings at several rivers, including Iba, Parada, Damana, Tapi, Karabena, Dahanuka, and Nava
- Established public water stations on both the banks of these rivers
- Donated 32,000 coconut tree stems at Nanamgola village to the associations of charakas at Pimditakavada, Govardhana, Suvarnamukha, and Shurparaka
- Purchased a field from a Brahmana family, and donated it to Buddhists along with a rock-cut cave (one of the Nasik Caves).

"Success! In the year 42, in the month Vesakha, Ushavadata, son of Dinika, son-in-law of king Nahapana, the Kshaharata Kshatrapa, has bestowed this cave on the Samgha generally...."

— Inscription No.12 of Nahapana, Cave No.10, Nasik

Nasik Pandavleni Caves, cave No.10
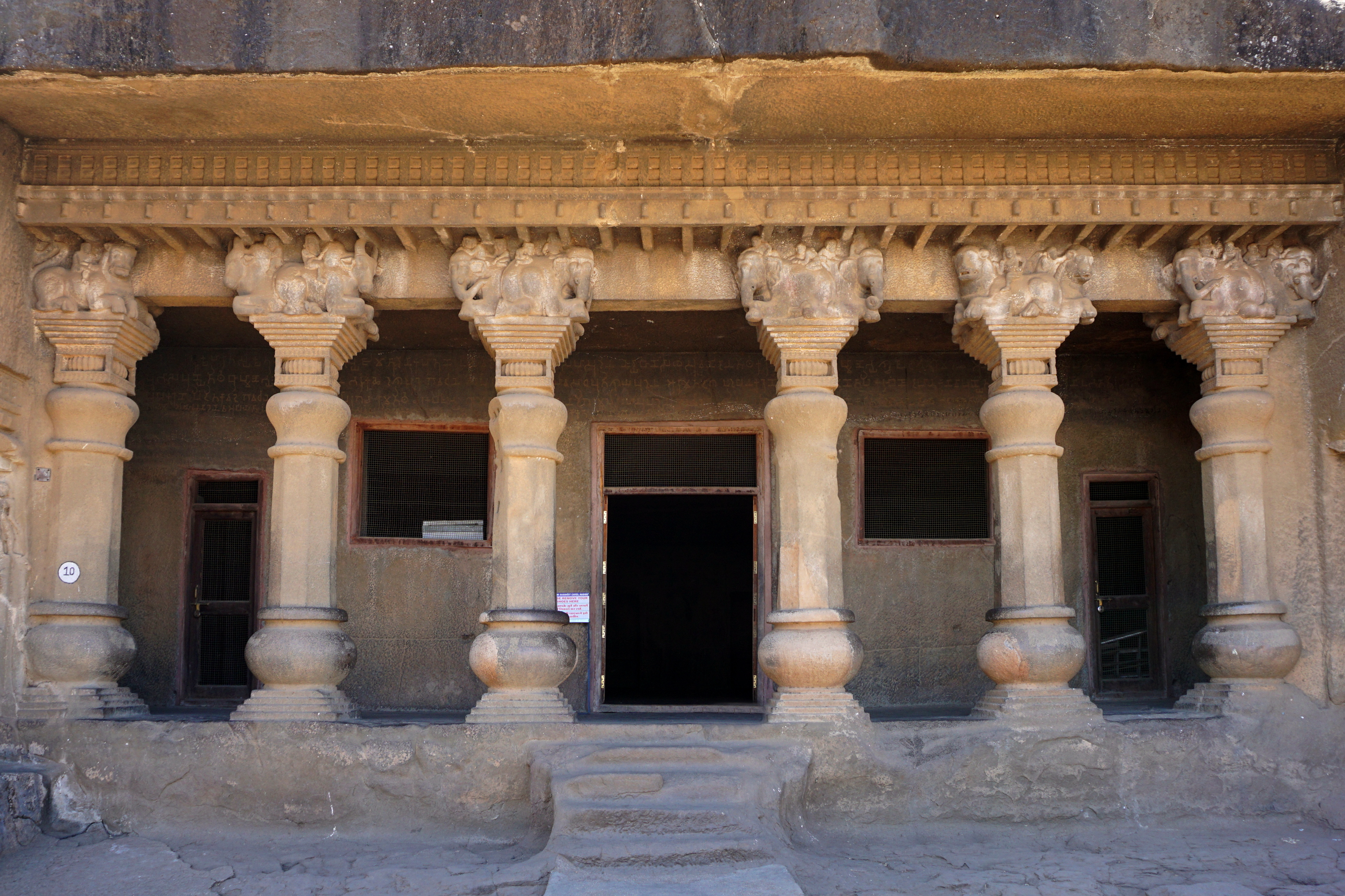
Front

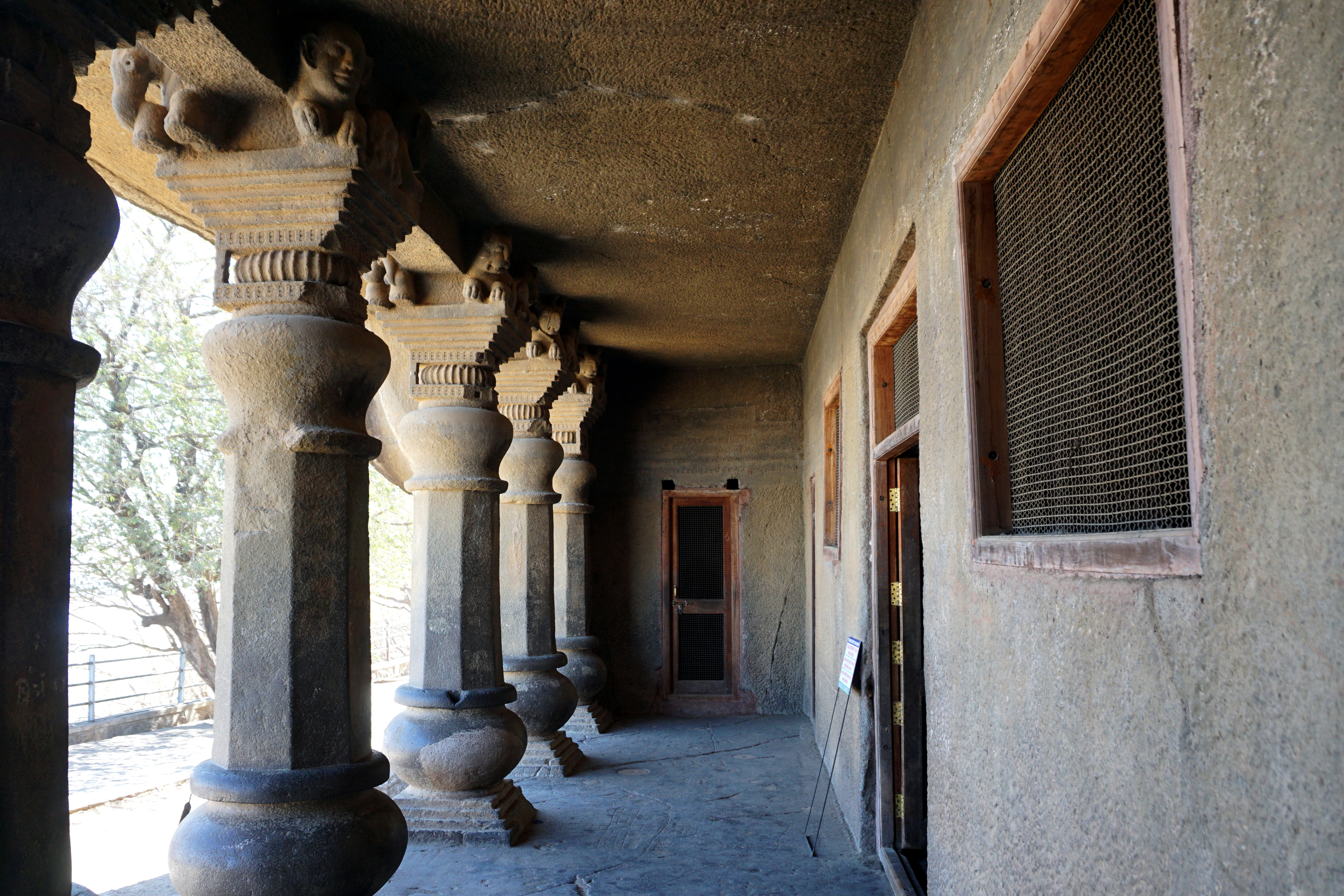
Veranda

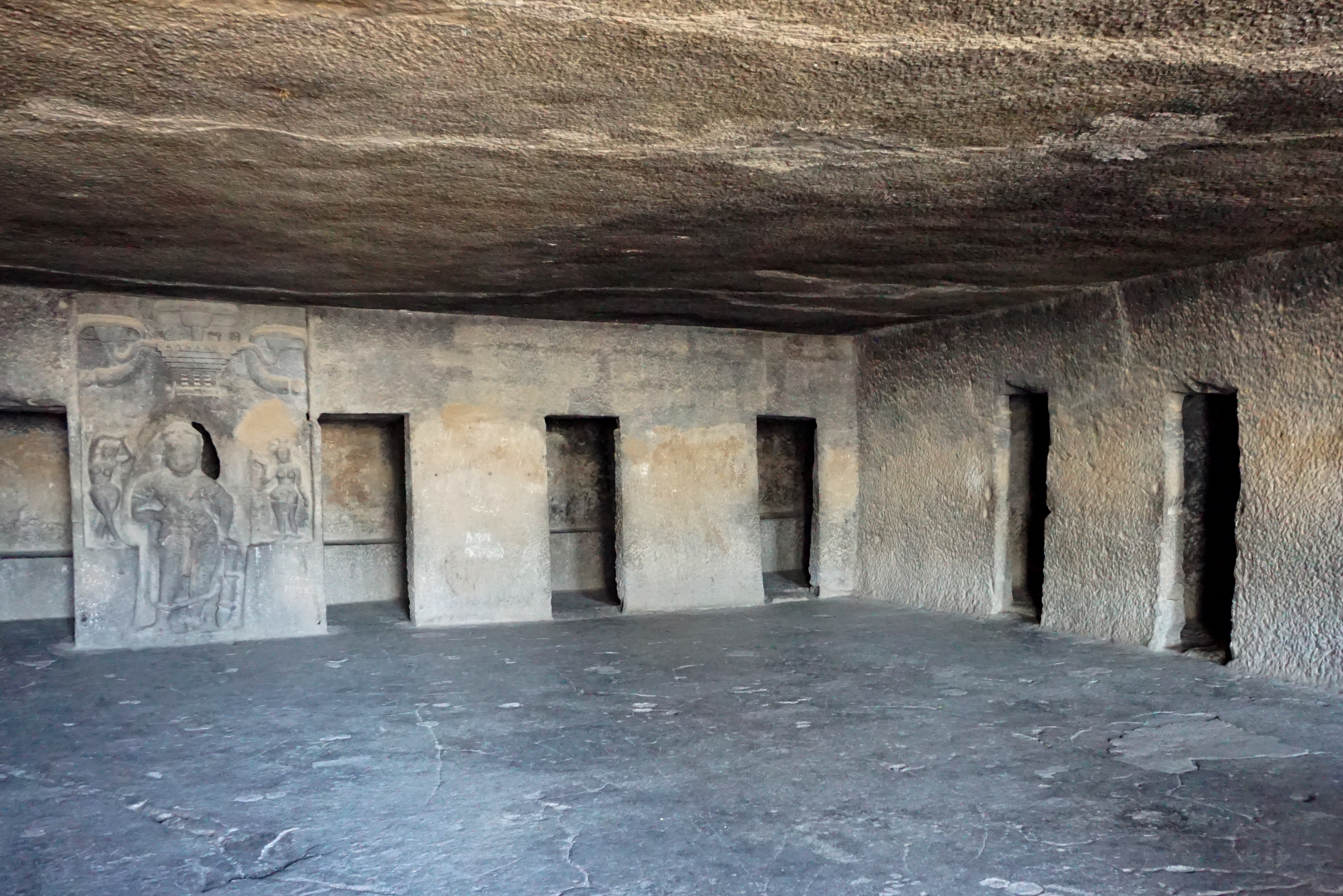
Interior

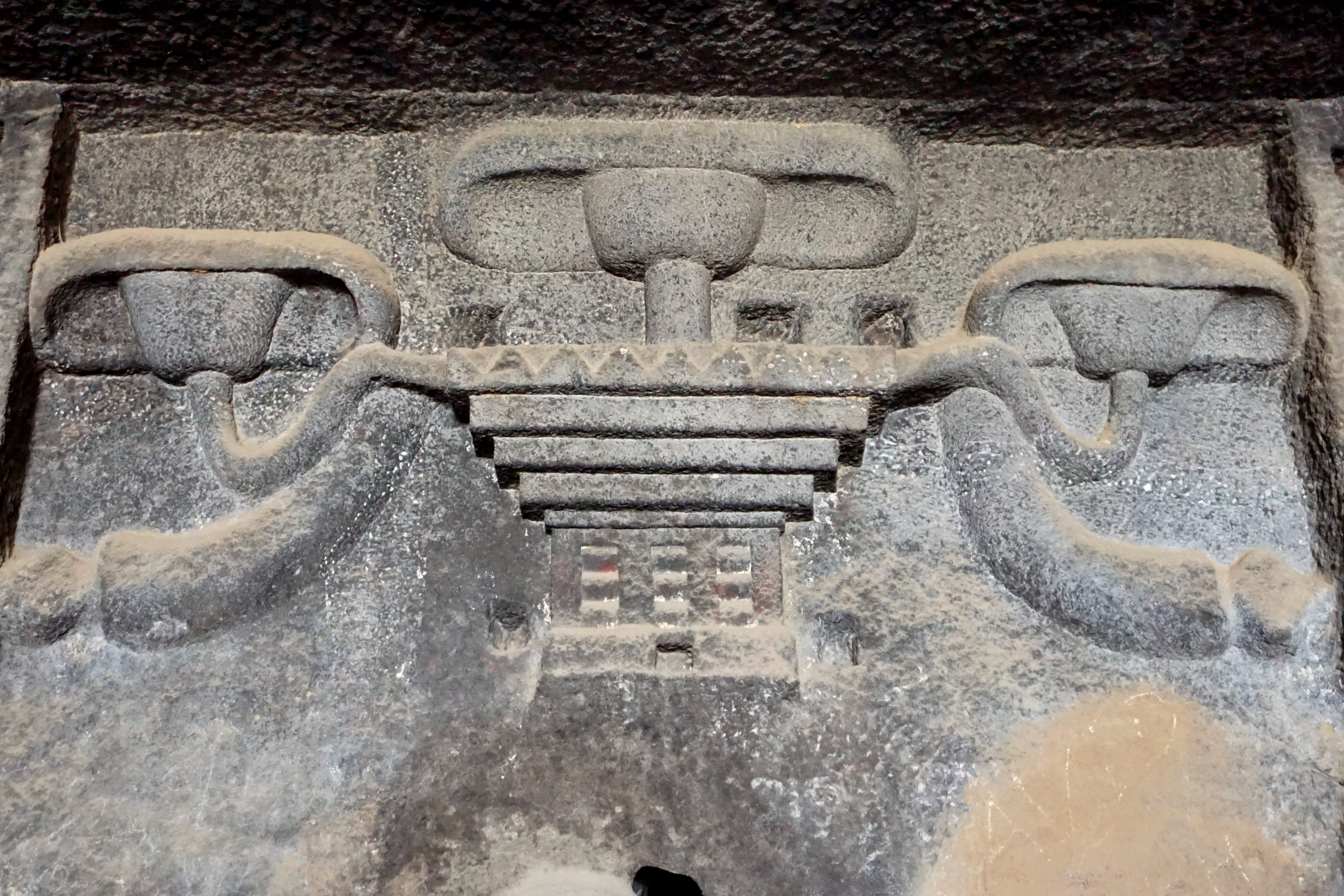
Chaitya and Umbrellas

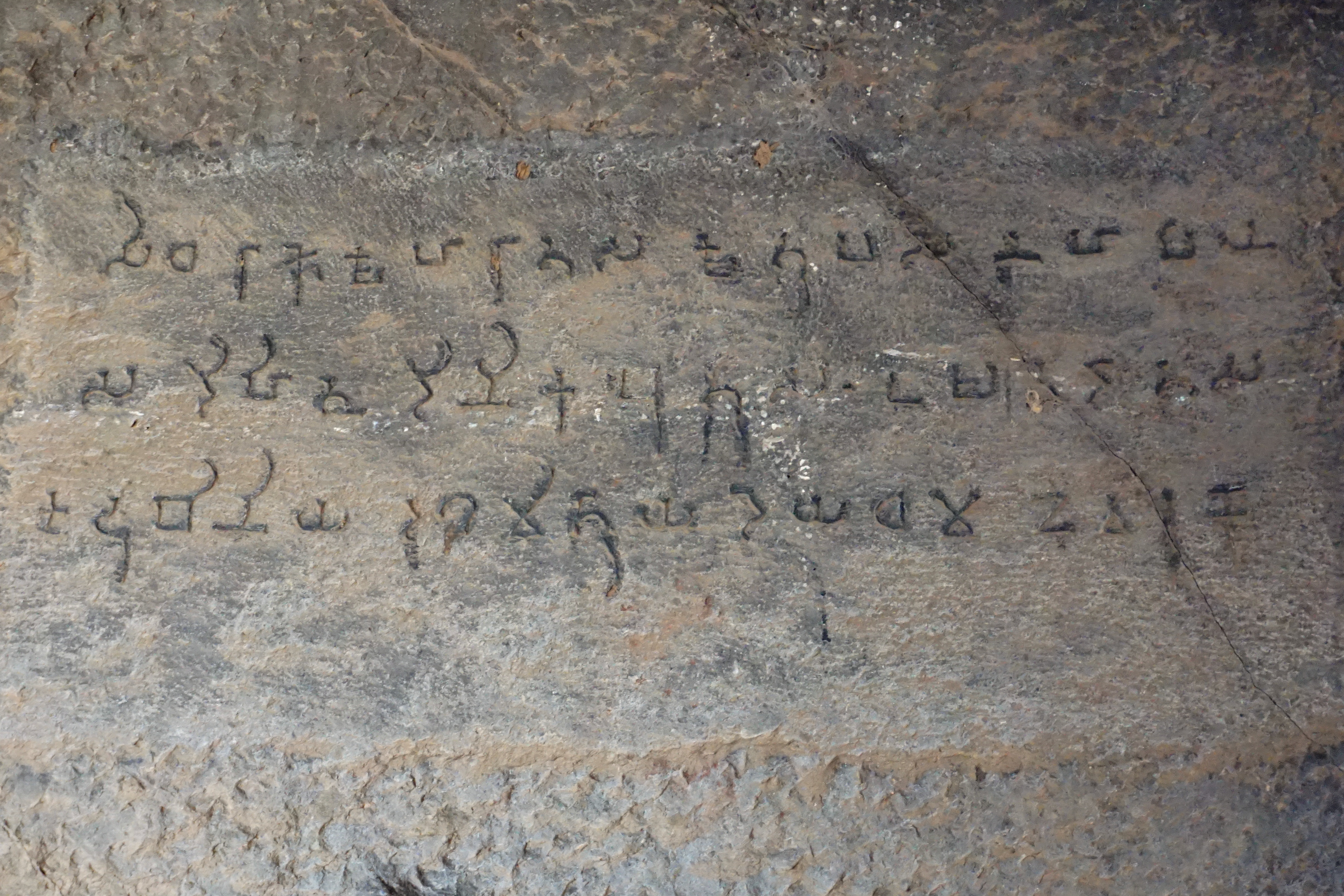
Inscription by Ushavadata's wife, Dakshamitra.

== Military career ==
Ushavadatta campaigned in the north under the orders of Nahapana to rescue the Uttamabhadras, who had been attacked by the Malayas (identified with the Malavas). He also extended the realm by defeating other enemies.

The Satavahana king Gautamiputra Satakarni appears to have defeated Rishabhadatta. An inscription discovered in Nashik, dated to the 18th year of Gautamiputra's reign, states that he donated a piece of land to Buddhist monks; this land was earlier in the possession of Ushavadata.

== See also ==
- Nasik inscription of Ushavadata
