= Sivasvati =

- Maharaja

Satavahana king
- Reign: 2nd century CE
- Predecessor: Satakarni
- Successor: Gautamiputra Satakarni
- Issue: Gautamiputra Satakarni
- Dynasty: Satavahana

Sivasvati was a Satavahana king during the 1st century CE. He is mentioned in all the Puranas except the Brahmanda, and is said to have ruled for 28 years

It was probably during the reign of Sivasvati that the Western Satraps invaded Northern Maharastra and Vidarbha and occupied the districts of Pune and Nashik, forcing the Satavahanas to abandon their capital Junnar and to move to Prastisthana (modern Paithan) in the vicinity of Aurangabad.

His Queen was probably Gautami Balashri who appears in an inscription at Nasik Caves as the donator of Cave No.3, and mother of Gautamiputra Satakarni.

Sivasti was probably the father of the famous Gautamiputra Satakarni, who in the Nasik inscription is said to have "destroyed the Sakas, Yavanas and Palhavas; who rooted out the Khakharata race; who restored the glory of the Satavahana family".

== Book sources ==
Rao (1994), History and Culture of Andhra Pradesh: from The Earliest Times To the Present Day, Sterling Publishers, ISBN 81-207-1719-8
