= Tushaspha =

Location of Girnar in India.

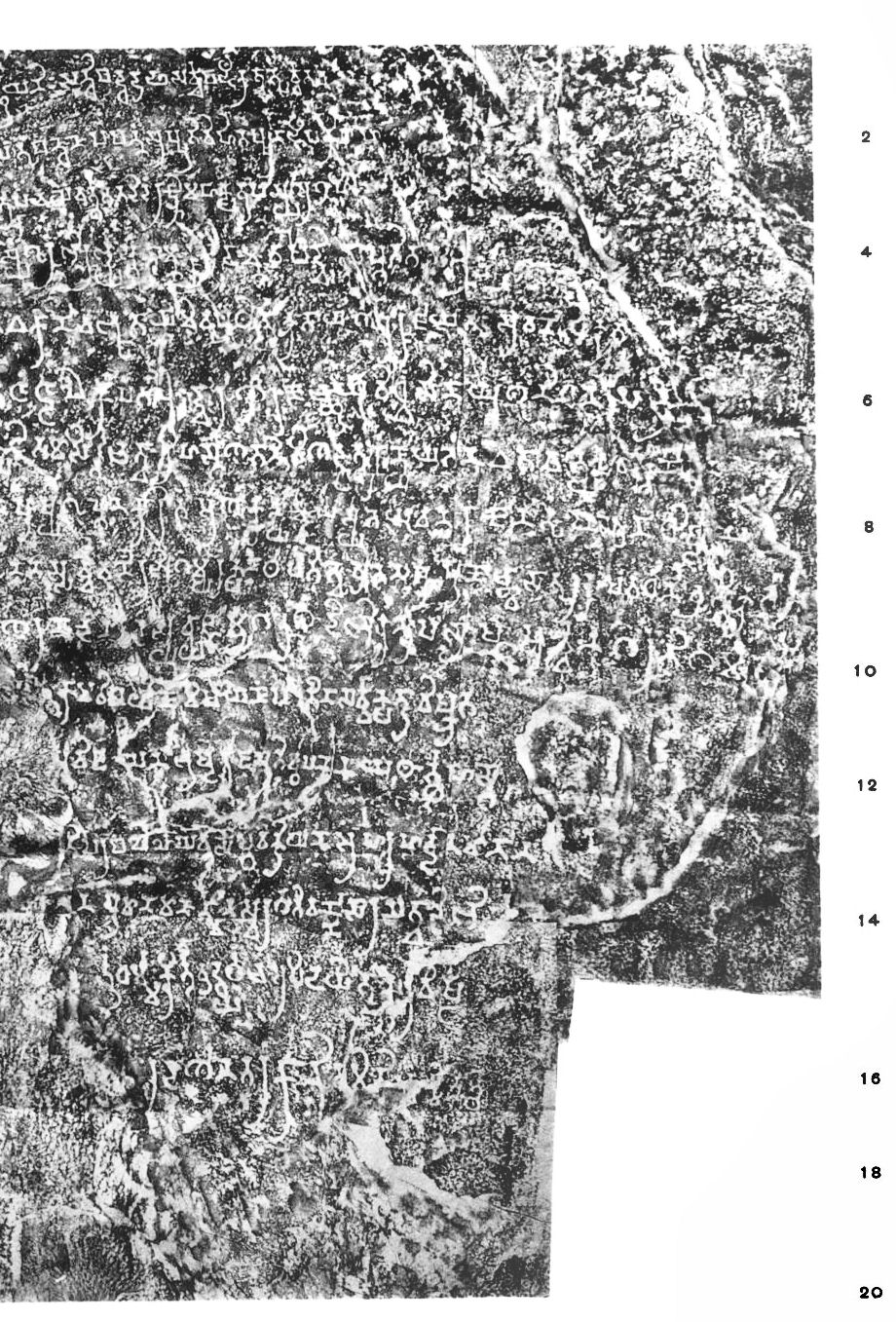
Tushaspa is mentioned in Junagadh rock inscription of Rudradaman (150 CE).

Tushaspa (Brahmi: Tuṣāspha) was a "Yavanaraja" (Greek King or Governor) for Emperor Ashoka, in the area of Girnar, near Junagadh, in Gujarat, India. He is only known from the Junagadh rock inscription of Rudradaman, in which the Western Satrap king Rudradaman, writing circa 150 CE, mentions his role in the construction of a local dam, in which he added a canal through Sudarshana Lake during the reign of Ashoka. The part of the inscription mentioning him reads:

"(L.8) (The dam was) ordered to be made by the Vaishya Pushyagupta, the provincial governor of the Maurya king Chandragupta; adorned with conduits for Ashoka the Maurya by the Yavana king Tushaspa while governing; and by the conduit ordered to be made by him, constructed in a manner worthy of a king (and) seen in that breach, the extensive dam..."

— Junagadh rock inscription of Rudradaman

According to some authors, the name Tushaspa seems to be Persian rather than Greek. Other authors however, consider that he was Greco-Bactrian, given his qualification as a "Yavana", the usual name for Greeks in the east.

Ashoka is known to have mentioned the presence of "Yavanas" in his kingdom in several of his Edicts of Ashoka:

"Here in the king's domain among the Greeks, the Kambojas, the Nabhakas, the Nabhapamkits, the Bhojas, the Pitinikas, the Andhras and the Palidas, everywhere people are following Beloved-Servant-of-the-Gods's instructions in Dhamma".

— Rock Edict No.13 (Translated by S. Dhammika)
