= Aparanta =

Geographical region of ancient India

India circa 500 BCE, with location of Aparanta.

Aparanta or Aparantaka (meaning 'Western border') was a geographical region of ancient India. It corresponded to the northern part of the Konkan region on the western coast of India. English civil servant-turned-historian J. F. Fleet believed that the Aparanta region included Kathiawad, Kutch, and Sindh, beside Konkan. However, historical records make it clear that the extent of Aparanta was much smaller.

The Junagadh inscription of Rudradaman mentions that during Ashoka's reign, a Yonaraja (literally; Ionian, or Greek, King), Tushaspha was the governor of Aparanta. A Buddhist text, the Mahavamsa states (xii.5) that at the conclusion of the Third Buddhist Council (c.250 BCE), a Yona (Greek) Thera (monk) Dhammarakkhita was sent here by the emperor Ashoka to preach Dhamma and 37,000 people embraced Buddhism due to his effort (Mahavamsa, xii.34-6). Ashoka mentioned the Aparanta in his edict:

te savapāsamdesu viyapatā dhammādhithanāye chā dhamma-vadhiyā hida-sukhāye vā dhamma-yutasa Yona-Kamboja-Gamdhālānam e vā pi amne apalamtā

—Fifth Major Rock Edict

They have been employed among all sects for the establishment and growth of Dharma and for the good and happiness of those devoted to religion even among the Yonas, Kambojas, Gandharas, Rastrikas, Pitinikas and whatever other peoples of Aparanta or western borders of mine there are.

According to Buddhist scholar A.K. Warder, the Dharmaguptaka sect originated here.

Aparanta is regarded as an umbrella term for Shurparakadesha for Konkan, to include in the North and Gomantaka in the south with the river Kundalika to serving as a dividing line in between the two.
