= Manasa Assembly constituency =

Assembly constituency in Madhya Pradesh

Coordinates: 24.48°N 75.14°E

Manasa
- Constituency No. 228 for the Madhya Pradesh Legislative Assembly

Constituency details
- Country: India
- Region: Central India
- State: Madhya Pradesh
- District: Neemuch
- Lok Sabha constituency: Mandsaur
- Established: 1951
- Reservation: None

Member of Legislative Assembly
- 16th Madhya Pradesh Legislative Assembly
- Incumbent Aniruddha Maroo
- Party: Bharatiya Janata Party
- Elected year: 2023
- Preceded by: Kailash Chawla

Manasa is one of the 230 Vidhan Sabha (Legislative Assembly) constituencies of Madhya Pradesh state in central India. This constituency came into existence in 1951 as one of the 79 Vidhan Sabha constituencies of the erstwhile Madhya Bharat state.

== Overview ==
Manasa (constituency number 228) is one of the 3 Vidhan Sabha constituencies located in Neemuch district. This constituency covers the entire Manasa tehsil of the district.

Manasa is part of Mandsour Lok Sabha constituency along with seven other Vidhan Sabha segments, namely, Neemuch and Jawad in this district, Jaora in Ratlam district and Mandsour, Malhargarh, Suwasra and Garoth in Mandsaur district.

== Members of the Legislative Assembly ==
=== Madhya Bharat Legislative Assembly ===
Year	Member	Party
1952	Ram Lal	Indian National Congress

=== Madhya Pradesh Legislative Assembly ===
Year	Member	Party
1957	Sunder Lal Patwa	Bharatiya Jana Sangh
1962	Sunder Lal Patwa	Bharatiya Jana Sangh
1967	Balkavi Bairagi	Indian National Congress
1972	Surajbhai Tugnawat	Indian National Congress
1977	Ramchandra Basar	Janata Party
1980	Balkavi Bairagi	Indian National Congress (I)
1985	Narendra Nahta	Indian National Congress
1990	Radheshyam Ladha	Bharatiya Janata Party
1993	Narendra Nahta	Indian National Congress
1998	Narendra Nahta	Indian National Congress
2003	Kailash Chawla	Bharatiya Janata Party
2008	Vijendra Singh Malaheda	Indian National Congress
2013	Kailash Chawla	Bharatiya Janata Party
2018	Aniruddha Maroo	Bharatiya Janata Party
2023	Aniruddha Maroo	Bharatiya Janata Party

== Election results ==
=== 2023 ===
2023 Madhya Pradesh Legislative Assembly election: Manasa
Party	Candidate	Votes	%	±%
BJP	Aniruddha Maroo	90,980	53.94	−2.7
INC	Narendra Nahata	71,993	42.68	+2.94
NOTA	None of the above	1,849	1.1	−0.28
Majority		18,987	11.26	−5.64
Turnout		168,681	84.3	−0.56
BJP hold		Swing		

=== 2018 ===
2018 Madhya Pradesh Legislative Assembly election: Manasa
Party	Candidate	Votes	%	±%
BJP	Aniruddha Maroo	87,004	56.64	
INC	Umrao Singh Shivlal	61,050	39.74	
BSP	Karulal Banjara	1,698	1.11	
NOTA	None of the above	2,117	1.38	
Majority		25,954	16.9	
Turnout		153,617	84.86	
BJP hold		Swing		

=== 2008 ===
- Vijendrasingh Malaheda (Vijju Banna) (INC) : 38,632 votes
- Aniruddha Rameshawar (Madhav Maru) (BJSH / Probably BJP Rebel or ally) : 33,197

=== 2003 ===
- Kailash Chawala (BJP) : 67,193 votes
- Narendra Nahata (INC) : 41,836

=== 1957 ===
- Sunderlal (BJS) : 12,437 votes
- Ramlal (INC) : 9,733

== See also ==
- Manasa
- Neemuch District
