= Sarwaniya Maharaj =

Human settlement in Madhya Pradesh, India

Coordinates: 24.573°N 74.965°E

Sarwaniya Maharaj was a village and now a Municipal council in Jawad Tehsil, Neemuch district, Madhya Pradesh, India. Sarwania Maharaj is a nagar which is located in Jawad Tehsil of Neemuch district, Madhya Pradesh with population of 6737 as per Population Census 2011. The Village is known for its greenery and old fort.
