= Kota Banswara National Highway =

National highway in India

Kota Banswara National Highway is a national highway in India. It connects the Kota and Banswara districts of Rajasthan. It runs across the Indian state of Madhya Pradesh. This highway benefits 29 of the 129 rural villages of Jawad and 23 of the 265 Manasa Tehsils in Neemuch District.

As of December 2018, the second phase of work had been started.
