= Khor, Jawad =

Town in Madhya Pradesh, India

Khor is a Census Town and Gram Panchayat in Jawad tehsil of Neemuch district, Madhya Pradesh. The total population as of 2011 was 5683.

The Nava Toran Temple is situated here.
