= Athana =

- Town
- अठाना
- Location in Madhya Pradesh, India Athana (India)
- Coordinates: 24°38′21″N 74°50′32″E
- Country: India
- State: Madhya Pradesh
- District: Neemuch
- Tehsil: Jawad

Languages
  - Official: Hindi
- Time zone: UTC+5:30 (IST)
- Vehicle registration: MP 44
- Website: www.neemuch.nic.in

Athana is a nagar parishad in Jawad Tehsil of Neemuch district, Madhya Pradesh, India. Athana is famous for its Krishna Palace built by Rawat Narsinghdas Ji in 1628.
