= Sukhanand Sagar Dam =

- Location of the dam within the state of Madhya Pradesh Sukhanand Sagar Dam (India)
- Official name: Kenpuriya Dam
- Location: Jawad, Neemuch District, Madhya Pradesh
- Coordinates: 24.6761311°N 74.8485959°E
- Opening date: 1 November 2012
- Construction cost: 51,565,000 rupees
- Operator: Water Resources Department, Madhya Pradesh

Dam and spillways
- Height: 11
- Length: 960

Reservoir
- Total capacity: 1.3 million m3

Sukhanand Sagar Dam, officially called Kenpuriya Dam, is a dam and reservoir complex on the river below Sukhanand Waterfall in Madhya Pradesh, India. Completed in 2012, it is 10 kilometres (6.2 mi) from the town of Jawad.

== Description ==
The dam is located near the famous ancient temple of Sukhanand Dham in the Jawad tehsil of Neemuch district in the Indian state of Madhya Pradesh. The dam is constructed from stones and has a cemented waste-ware on the river that flows from Sukhanand Waterfall. It is mainly used for irrigation and water supply. The only access to the dam is via Jawad.
