= Morwan Dam =

Dam in Neemuch, Madhya Pradesh, India

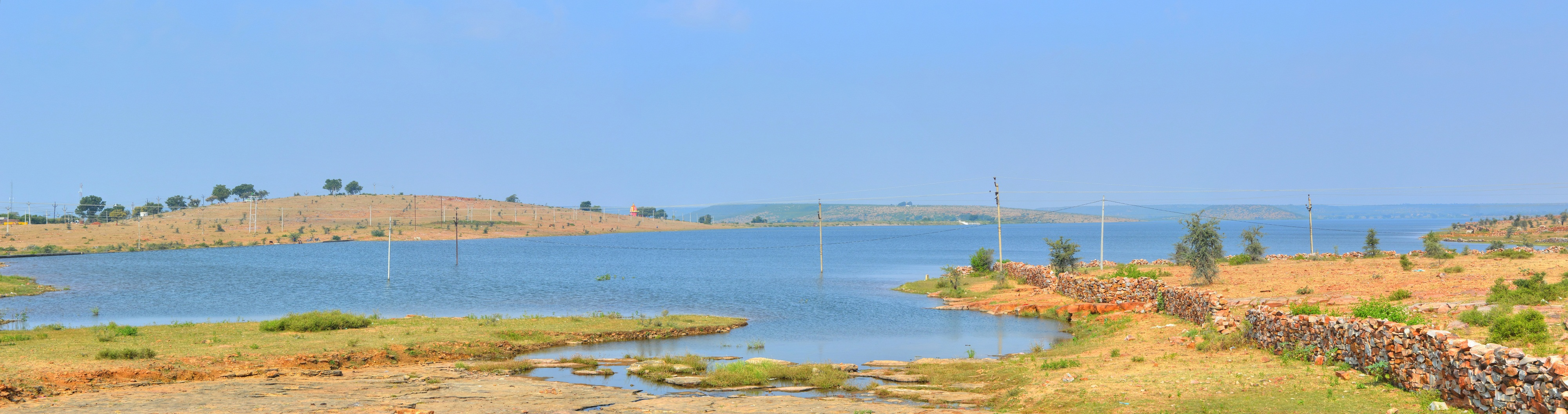

- Location of the dam within the state of Madhya Pradesh Morwan Dam (India)
- Official name: Morwan Dam
- Location: Jawad, Neemuch District, Madhya Pradesh
- Coordinates: 24.629013°N 75.003774°E
- Opening date: 1959
- Operator: Water Resources Department, Madhya Pradesh

Dam and spillways
- Impounds: Gambhiri River, a tributary of Chambal River

Reservoir
- Creates: Multipurpose
- Total capacity: 16.4 million m3

Morwan Dam is located in the village of Morwan in Jawad tehsil, 24 km from Neemuch in the Indian state of Madhya Pradesh. The dam is constructed wholly from stones and clay on the River Gambhir and is mainly used for irrigation and water supply. Boating facilities and a public garden are provided. Access by bus is via the Neemuch-Singoli-Kota Road.
