= Diken (disambiguation) =

Diken is a city in India.

Diken may also refer to:

- Diken (newspaper), a newspaper in Turkey
- Diken (magazine), an Ottoman satirical magazine
