= Jawad Assembly constituency =

Assembly constituency in Madhya Pradesh

Coordinates: 24.59°N 74.86°E

Jawad
- Constituency No. 230 for the Madhya Pradesh Legislative Assembly

Constituency details
- Country: India
- Region: Central India
- State: Madhya Pradesh
- District: Neemuch
- Lok Sabha constituency: Mandsaur
- Established: 1951
- Reservation: None

Member of Legislative Assembly
- 16th Madhya Pradesh Legislative Assembly
- Incumbent Om Prakash Sakhlecha
- Party: Bharatiya Janata Party
- Elected year: 2023
- Preceded by: Ghanshyam Patidar

Jawad is one of the 230 Vidhan Sabha (Legislative Assembly) constituencies of Madhya Pradesh state in central India. This constituency came into existence in 1951 as one of the 79 Vidhan Sabha constituencies of the erstwhile Madhya Bharat state.

== Overview ==
Jawad (constituency number 230) is one of the 3 Vidhan Sabha constituencies located in Neemuch district. This constituency covers the entire Jawad tehsil of the district.

Jawad is part of Mandsaur Lok Sabha constituency along with seven other Vidhan Sabha segments, namely, Manasa and Neemuch in this district, Jaora in Ratlam district and Mandsaur, Malhargarh, Suwasra and Garoth in Mandsaur district.

== Members of Vidhan Sabha ==
=== Madhya Bharat Legislative Assembly ===
| Year | Name | Party |
|---|---|---|
| 1952 | Badri Datt | Indian National Congress |

=== Madhya Pradesh Legislative Assembly ===
| Year | Name | Party |
|---|---|---|
| 1957 | Virendra Kumar Sakhlecha | Bharatiya Jana Sangh |
| 1962 | Virendra Kumar Sakhlecha | Bharatiya Jana Sangh |
| 1967 | Virendra Kumar Sakhlecha | Bharatiya Jana Sangh |
| 1972 | Kanhiyalal Nagauri | Indian National Congress |
| 1977 | Virendra Kumar Sakhlecha | Janata Party |
| 1980 | Virendra Kumar Sakhlecha | Bharatiya Janata Party |
| 1985 | Chunnilal Dhakad | Indian National Congress |
| 1990 | Duli Chand | Bharatiya Janata Party |
| 1993 | Ghanshyam Patidar | Indian National Congress |
| 1998 | Ghanshyam Patidar | Indian National Congress |
| 2003 | Om Prakash Sakhlecha | Bharatiya Janata Party |
| 2008 | Om Prakash Sakhlecha | Bharatiya Janata Party |
| 2013 | Om Prakash Sakhlecha | Bharatiya Janata Party |
| 2018 | Om Prakash Sakhlecha | Bharatiya Janata Party |
| 2023 | Om Prakash Sakhlecha | Bharatiya Janata Party |

== Election results ==
=== 2023 ===
2023 Madhya Pradesh Legislative Assembly election: Jawad
| Party | Candidate | Votes | % | ±% |
|---|---|---|---|---|
| BJP | Om Prakash Sakhlecha | 60,458 | 38.0 | +0.6 |
| INC | Samandar Patel | 58,094 | 36.51 | +2.16 |
| Independent | Puranmal Ahir | 36,151 | 22.72 | |
| NOTA | None of the above | 1,315 | 0.83 | −0.56 |
| Majority | | 2,364 | 1.49 | −1.56 |
| Turnout | | 159,111 | 87.58 | +3.12 |
| BJP hold | | Swing | | |

=== 2018 ===
2018 Madhya Pradesh Legislative Assembly election: Jawad
| Party | Candidate | Votes | % | ±% |
|---|---|---|---|---|
| BJP | Om Prakash Sakhlecha | 52,316 | 37.4 | |
| INC | Rajkumar Rameshchandra Ahir | 48,045 | 34.35 | |
| Independent | Samandar Patel | 33,712 | 24.1 | |
| NOTA | None of the above | 1,941 | 1.39 | |
| Majority | | 4,271 | 3.05 | |
| Turnout | | 139,889 | 84.46 | |
| BJP hold | | Swing | | |

=== 1998 ===
- Ghanshyam Patidar (INC) : 55,502 votes
- Virendra Kumar Sakhlecha (IND) : 46,609

=== 1967 ===
- Virendrakumar (Jana Sangh) : 21,882 votes
- Jagjeewan (INC) : 18,632

== See also ==
- Jawad
