= Ratangarh =

Ratangarh may refer to:

== India ==
=== Uttar Pradesh ===
- Ratangarh, Bijnor - a village in Uttar Pradesh

=== Rajasthan ===
- Ratangarh, Churu - a town in Rajasthan

=== Madhya Pradesh ===
- Ratangarh, Neemuch - a town in Madhya Pradesh
- Ratangarh, Datia - a village in Madhya Pradesh

=== Maharashtra ===
- Ratangad - a village in Maharashtra
