= Changera =

Village in Madhya Pradesh, India

Coordinates: 24.5011°N 74.8327°E

Changera is a village in Dungalawda Panchayat, Neemuch district, Madhya Pradesh, India.

According to the 2011 Census of India, Changera had a population of 869.
