= Haribhau =

Haribhau is a given name. Notable people with the name include:

- Haribhau Bagade (born 1944), Indian politician
- Haribhau Jawale (1953–2000), Indian politician
- Haribhau Joshi (died 2009), Indian politician
- Haribhau Upadhyaya, Indian politician
- Sanjay Haribhau Jadhav, Indian politician
