= Om Prakash Sakhlecha =

Indian politician

Member of the 16th Madhya Pradesh Assembly
- Incumbent
- Assumed office 2003
- Preceded by: Ghanshyam Patidar
- Constituency: Jawad

Personal details
- Political party: Bhartiya Janta Party
- Occupation: Politician

Om Prakash Sakhlecha, is an Indian politician and elected member (MLA) from Jawad Vidhan Sabha constituency, district Neemuch in Madhya Pradesh state. In June 2020 he was appointed Cabinet Minister in Shivraj Singh Chouhan Government which formed in Madhya Pradesh after Jyotiraditya Scindia along with his 22 MLAs rebelled against Congress and toppled Kamalnath Government. Currently he is Minister for MSME Sector and Minister of Science and Technology under Shivraj Singh Chouhan govt. He is member of the Bharatiya Janata Party.

== Biography ==
Mr. Sakhlecha was born on 3 October 1958, to Virendra Kumar Sakhlecha and Chetan Sakhlecha. He graduated from Delhi University in Commerce in 1979.
