= Neemuch Assembly constituency =

Assembly constituency in Madhya Pradesh

Coordinates: 24.47°N 74.87°E

Neemuch
- Constituency No. 229 for the Madhya Pradesh Legislative Assembly

Constituency details
- Country: India
- Region: Central India
- State: Madhya Pradesh
- District: Neemuch
- Lok Sabha constituency: Mandsour
- Established: 1951
- Reservation: None

Member of Legislative Assembly
- 16th Madhya Pradesh Legislative Assembly
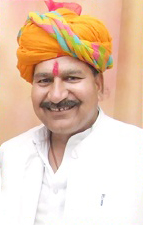
- Incumbent Dilip Singh Parihar
- Party: Bharatiya Janata Party
- Elected year: 2023
- Preceded by: Khuman Singh Shivaji

Neemuch Assembly constituency is one of the 230 Vidhan Sabha (Legislative Assembly) constituencies of Madhya Pradesh state in central India. This constituency came into existence in 1951 as one of the 79 Vidhan Sabha constituencies of the erstwhile Madhya Bharat state.

== Overview ==
Neemuch (constituency number 229) is one of the 3 Vidhan Sabha constituencies located in Neemuch district. This constituency covers the entire Neemuch tehsil of the district.

Neemuch is part of Mandsour Lok Sabha constituency along with seven other Vidhan Sabha segments, namely, Manasa and Jawad in this district, Jaora Assembly constituency in Ratlam district and Mandsaur Assembly constituency, Malhargarh Assembly constituency, Suwasra and Garoth Assembly constituency in Mandsaur district.

== Members of Legislative Assembly ==
=== Madhya Bharat Legislative Assembly ===
Election	Name	Party
1952	Sitaram Jajoo	Indian National Congress

=== Madhya Pradesh Legislative Assembly ===
Election	Name	Party
1957	Sitaram Jajoo	Indian National Congress
1962	Khuman Singh	Jana Sangh
1967	Khuman Singh	Bharatiya Jana Sangh
1972	Raghunandan Prasad Verma	Indian National Congress
1977	Kanhaiyalal Dungerlal	Janata Party
1980	Raghunandan Prasad Verma	Indian National Congress (Indira)
1985	Sampatswaroop Sitaram Jajoo	Indian National Congress
1990	Khuman Singh Shivaji	Bharatiya Janata Party
1993	Khuman Singh Shivaji	Bharatiya Janata Party
1998	Nandkishore Patel	Bharatiya Janata Party
2003	Dilip Singh Parihar	Bharatiya Janata Party
2008	Khuman Singh Shivaji	Bharatiya Janata Party
2013	Dilip Singh Parihar	Bharatiya Janata Party
2018	Dilip Singh Parihar	Bharatiya Janata Party
2023	Dilip Singh Parihar	Bharatiya Janata Party

== Election results ==
=== 2023 ===
2023 Madhya Pradesh Legislative Assembly election: Neemuch
Party	Candidate	Votes	%	±%
BJP	Dilip Singh Parihar	105,290	55.67	+3.74
INC	Umrao Singh Gurjar	79,007	41.77	−1.31
NOTA	None of the above	1,840	0.97	−0.31
Majority		26,283	13.9	+5.05
Turnout		189,146	82.57	+2.88
BJP hold		Swing		

=== 2018 ===
2018 Madhya Pradesh Legislative Assembly election: Neemuch
Party	Candidate	Votes	%	±%
BJP	Dilip Singh Parihar	87,197	51.93	
INC	Satya Narayan	72,340	43.08	
AAP	Naveen Kumar Agrawal	2,046	1.22	
NOTA	None of the above	2,147	1.28	
Majority		14,857	8.85	
Turnout		167,902	79.69	
BJP gain from		Swing		

== See also ==
- Neemuch
