= JRN =

JRN may refer to:

- Japan Radio Network
- Jhalar railway station, in Pakistan
- Jiran, Madhya Pradesh, India
- Jones Radio Networks
- Juruena Airport, in Brazil
