= Dilip Singh Parihar =

Indian politician

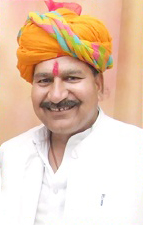

Member of the Madhya Pradesh Legislative Assembly
- Constituency: Neemuch

Personal details
- Born: 17 December 1957 (age 68) Neemuch, Madhya Pradesh, India
- Citizenship: India
- Party: Bhartiya Janta Party
- Spouse: Suchitra Singh Parihar
- Children: 2 (1 Boy, 1 Girl)
- Parent(s): Hari Singh Parihar; Kamla Devi Parihar

Dilip Singh Parihar (born 17 December 1957) is an Indian politician and a member of the Madhya Pradesh Legislative Assembly, representing the Neemuch constituency. He was first elected in 2003 and re-elected in 2013. He is a member of the Bharatiya Janata Party.
