= Sakhlecha ministry =

Government of Madhya Pradesh, India (1978–1980)

- Ministry of Madhya Pradesh
- no
- Date formed: 18 January 1978
- Date dissolved: 19 January 1980

People and organisations
- Chief Minister: Virendra Kumar Sakhlecha
- Member party: Janata Party

The Virendra Kumar Sakhlecha ministry was the Council of Ministers in Madhya Pradesh headed by Virendra Kumar Sakhlecha of the Janata Party. Sakhlecha served as Chief Minister of Madhya Pradesh from 18 January 1978 to 19 January 1980. Here are the names of ministers in his ministry:

== Council of Ministers ==
Name	Office	Portfolio	Took office	Left office
Virendra Kumar Sakhlecha	Chief Minister		18 January 1978	19 January 1980
Kailash Joshi	Cabinet Minister		18 January 1978	19 January 1980
Ramhit Gupta	Cabinet Minister		18 January 1978	19 January 1980
Shitala Sahai	Cabinet Minister		18 January 1978	19 January 1980
Haribhau Joshi	Cabinet Minister		18 January 1978	19 January 1980
Laxmi Narayan Sharma	Cabinet Minister		18 January 1978	19 January 1980
Yeshwant Rao Meghawale	Cabinet Minister		18 January 1978	19 January 1980
Jabar Singh	Cabinet Minister		18 January 1978	19 January 1980
Shiv Prasad Chandpuria	Cabinet Minister		18 January 1978	19 January 1980
Umrao Singh	Cabinet Minister		18 January 1978	19 January 1980
Jayashree Banerjee	Cabinet Minister		18 January 1978	19 January 1980
Ramanand Singh	Cabinet Minister		18 January 1978	19 January 1980
Sakharam Patel	Cabinet Minister		18 January 1978	19 January 1980
Sita Prasad Sharma	Cabinet Minister		18 January 1978	19 January 1980
Anood Singh Maravi	Cabinet Minister		18 January 1978	19 January 1980
Baliram Kashyap	Cabinet Minister		18 January 1978	19 January 1980
Prabhunarayan Tripati	Cabinet Minister		18 January 1978	19 January 1980
Laxminarayan Yadav	Cabinet Minister		18 January 1978	19 January 1980
Pawan Diwan	Cabinet Minister		18 January 1978	19 January 1980
Mohammad Yaqoob Rajwan	Cabinet Minister		18 January 1978	19 January 1980
Jang Bahadur Singh	Cabinet Minister		18 January 1978	19 January 1980
Shareef Master	Cabinet Minister		18 January 1978	19 January 1980
Rajendra Dharkar	Minister of State		18 January 1978	19 January 1980
Manharan Lal Pandey	Minister of State		18 January 1978	19 January 1980
Jagdish Gupta	Minister of State		18 January 1978	19 January 1980
Vibhash Chandra Banerjee	Minister of State		18 January 1978	19 January 1980
Parashuram Sahu	Minister of State		18 January 1978	19 January 1980
Nathuram Ahirwar	Minister of State		18 January 1978	19 January 1980
Sharas Chandra Jharia	Minister of State		18 January 1978	19 January 1980
Smt. Savita Bajpai	Minister of State		18 January 1978	19 January 1980
Ramlal Chandrakar	Minister of State		18 January 1978	19 January 1980
Thakur Darbar Singh	Minister of State		18 January 1978	19 January 1980
Rama Shanker Singh	Minister of State		18 January 1978	19 January 1980
