= Legal opium production in India =

Legal cultivation of opium for medicinal purposes is carried out in India, only in selected areas, under free licensing conditions. India is the world's largest manufacturer of legal opium for the pharmaceutical industry according to the CIA World Factbook. India is one among 12 countries in world where legal cultivation for medical use is permissible within the ambit of United Nations, Single Convention on Narcotic Drugs 1961. In India legal cultivation is done primarily in Madhya Pradesh, Rajasthan and Uttar Pradesh. Despite producing poppy for opium production India depends heavily on imports to meet need of Poppy seed for edible purposes and domestic Codeine demand for medical purposes (more than 30% by imports). Opium is heavily imported from its top producing nations like Afghanistan. There is also an account of Opium black marketing in India.

== Background ==
The cultivation of poppy in India for Opium production has occurred since as early as 1000CE, where it was called "Dhanwantri Nighantu". It was also cultivated in the early 16th Century. It constituted 15% of revenue of British Raj from Colonial India. The legalized cultivation and management of produce under strict government control continued in India even post independence.

Opium poppy (Papaver somniferous) plant is the source of opium gum which contains psychoactive alkaloids. Some of these alkaloids include Morphine, Codeine and Thebaine. Morphine is one of the most widely used analgesic in the world and is the precursor to Heroin, also known as diacetylmorphine. In case of extreme and excruciating pain such as that of terminally ill cancer patients, nothing alleviates the suffering except morphine. Codeine is commonly used in manufacture of cough syrups.

The NDPS act empowers the Central Government to permit and regulate cultivation of opium poppy for medical and scientific purposes. The Government of India notifies the tracts where opium cultivation can be licensed as well as the General Conditions for issuance of license every year. These notifications are commonly referred to as Opium Policies. Opium cultivation is permitted in the notified tracts in the states of Madhya Pradesh, Rajasthan and Uttar Pradesh The General Conditions, among others, include a Minimum Qualifying Yield (MQY) to be tendered by the cultivators of each of these three states, to be eligible for license in the succeeding year.

Presently, the Central Bureau of Narcotics (CBN), is responsible for overall supervision of cultivation as per provisions of the Narcotic Drugs and Psychotropic Substances Act, 1985. The produce from licensed cultivators are procured solely by government fixing strict norms on quantity and quality. The produce is then supplied by government to Government Opium and Alkaloid Factories (GOAF).

== Process of cultivation ==
Each year the Central Government notifies the selected tracts where such cultivation will be permitted, and the general conditions for eligibility of the licence. The essential condition for issue of licence is, fulfillment of minimum qualifying yield (MQY) criterion, specified in number of kilograms per hectare. Cultivators who have tendered at least this quantity in the previous year are eligible for licence. The licence among other conditions, specifies the maximum area in which the opium crop can be sown.

If farmer realizes that the yield will be less than MQY then they have only an option of destroying the entire crop with government permission. If a farmer produces less than MQY then they may face legal action and will lose their license.

The Central Bureau of Narcotics (CBN), Gwalior (Madhya Pradesh) under the Narcotics Commissioner issues licenses to the farmers to cultivate opium poppy. Some places where opium is grown are Pratapgarh in Rajasthan; Mandsaur, Ratlam, Neemuch in Madhya Pradesh; and Barabanki, Bareilly, Lucknow & Faizabad in Uttar Pradesh. For the crop year 2008–09, total number of licences issued was 44821, while MQY was fixed at 56 kg/ha for Rajasthan, Madhya Pradesh and 49 kg/ha for Uttar Pradesh. Officers of Central Bureau of Narcotics measure each field and exercise controls to ensure that no excess cultivation takes place.

The crop year starts from November and ends on March every year. The extraction of opium takes place during the months of February and March. Farmers still use the traditional method where they lance each poppy capsule manually with a special blade like tool, a process known as lancing. The lancing is done in late afternoon or evenings. The opium latex which oozes out and congeals in the night is scraped and collected manually the next morning. Each poppy capsule is given three to four lancings.

All such opium collected is required to be necessarily tendered to the government, at specially set up opium collection centres, in early April. Opium is checked for quality and consistency and weighed at the centres. Prices are paid which are fixed by the Government in slab rates, depending on the quality and quantity of opium tendered. 90% of payment is made to the cultivators, directly in their bank account through e-payment method. Final payment is made after laboratory testing at opium factory after confirming that no adulterants have been found. All the opium procured is sent to Government Opium and Alkaloid Factories situated at Neemuch and Ghazipur. Opium is dried and processed at these factories for export and is also used for extraction of various alkaloid products like Codeine phosphate, Thebaine, Morphine sulphate, Noscapine that are sold for pharmaceutical operations. But manufacturing of drugs such as Crude cocaine, ecgonine and diacetylmorphine (commonly known as heroin) and their salts are illegal and completely prohibited.

The state of West Bengal was trying to obtain permission to cultivate poppy since poppy seeds (khus khus) is an integral part of Bengali cuisine and hence has a huge domestic demand.

== Diversion and illegal production ==
There are rampant diversions and illegal productions of opium found in India and India is regarded as third largest illicit opium producer in the world. The diverted opium finds its way into North West Indian states like Punjab, where it forms an integral component in illegal drug trafficking. There is a ban on sale and trade of poppy husk (doda chura), a leftover from fields that was widely used in informal drug market in states like Rajasthan from 2015. The wide difference between the prices in the illegal market (Rs. 200,000 - 5,00,000/- per kg) and government rates (Rs. 1800/- per kg) is one factor that prompts diversion and rampant corruption in enforcement. There are strict laws against diversion in India. If caught then a farmer will lose their license to cultivate poppy and will be booked under Narcotic Drugs and Psychotropic Substances Act.

Opium addicts registered with the State Governments are supplied prescription opium by the Governments as part of deaddiction. The Government Opium and Alkaloid Works at Ghazipur and Neemuch sell opium to the State Governments who, in turn, supply it to the addicts.

There are also instances of reduction in crop due to theft, attacks from animals, weather events like hailstorms, drought and attack of Parrots which are often accused as diversion.

== See also ==
- Opium and Alkaloid Works
- Papaver somniferum
- Opium Wars
- Jamsetjee Jejeebhoy
