= Aniruddha Maroo =

Indian politician

Aniruddha Madhav Maru (born 1961) is an Indian politician from Madhya Pradesh. He is an MLA from Manasa Assembly constituency in Neemuch District. He won the 2023 Madhya Pradesh Legislative Assembly election, representing the Bharatiya Janata Party.

== Early life and education ==
Maru is from Manasa, Neemuch District, Madhya Pradesh. He is the son of Rameshwar. He completed his graduation in mechanical engineering in 1986 at Samrat Ashok Technological College, Bidisha, which is affiliated with Bhopal University.

== Career ==
Maru won from Manasa Assembly constituency in the 2023 Madhya Pradesh Legislative Assembly election representing the Bharatiya Janata Party. He polled 90,980 votes and defeated his nearest rival, Narendra Nahata of the Indian National Congress, by a margin of 18,987 votes.
