= Nava Toran Temple =

Coordinates: 24.5930°N 74.8175°E

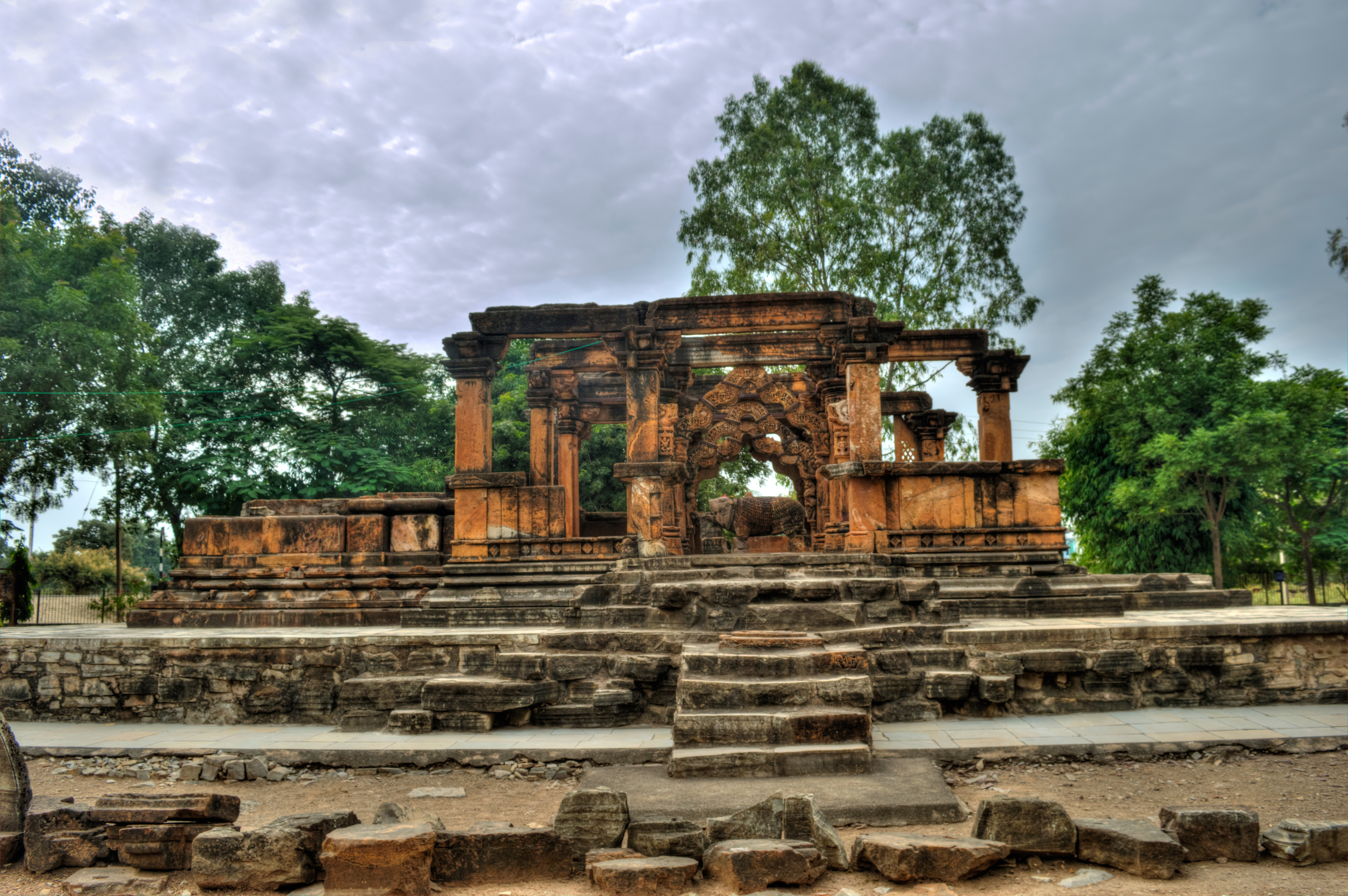
- Ancient Nav Toran Temple

Religion
- Affiliation: Hinduism
- Deity: Varaha

Location
- Location: Jawad
- State: Madhya Pradesh
- Country: India
- Interactive map of Nava Toran Temple

Architecture
- Creator: Maharana
- Completed: 11th century
- Temple: 1

Nava Toran Temple is located at Khor, Jawad census town, under Jawad tehsil in Neemuch district, Madhya Pradesh, India. It is an eleventh-century temple which consists of ten decorative arches arranged in two rows. The temple decorations include leaf-shaped borders, heads of makaras, and garland bearers, Nav or nou means "nine" and toran means "pillars"; this is where the temple gets its name. The prime deity of the temple is Varaha, who is the third avatar of lord Vishnu. It is said that there is a tunnel beneath the temple that goes to the Chittor Fort and that Maharana Pratap often used to go through the tunnel to worship the deity of the temple.
