= Jiran =

Jeeran Jiran
- City
- Jeeran
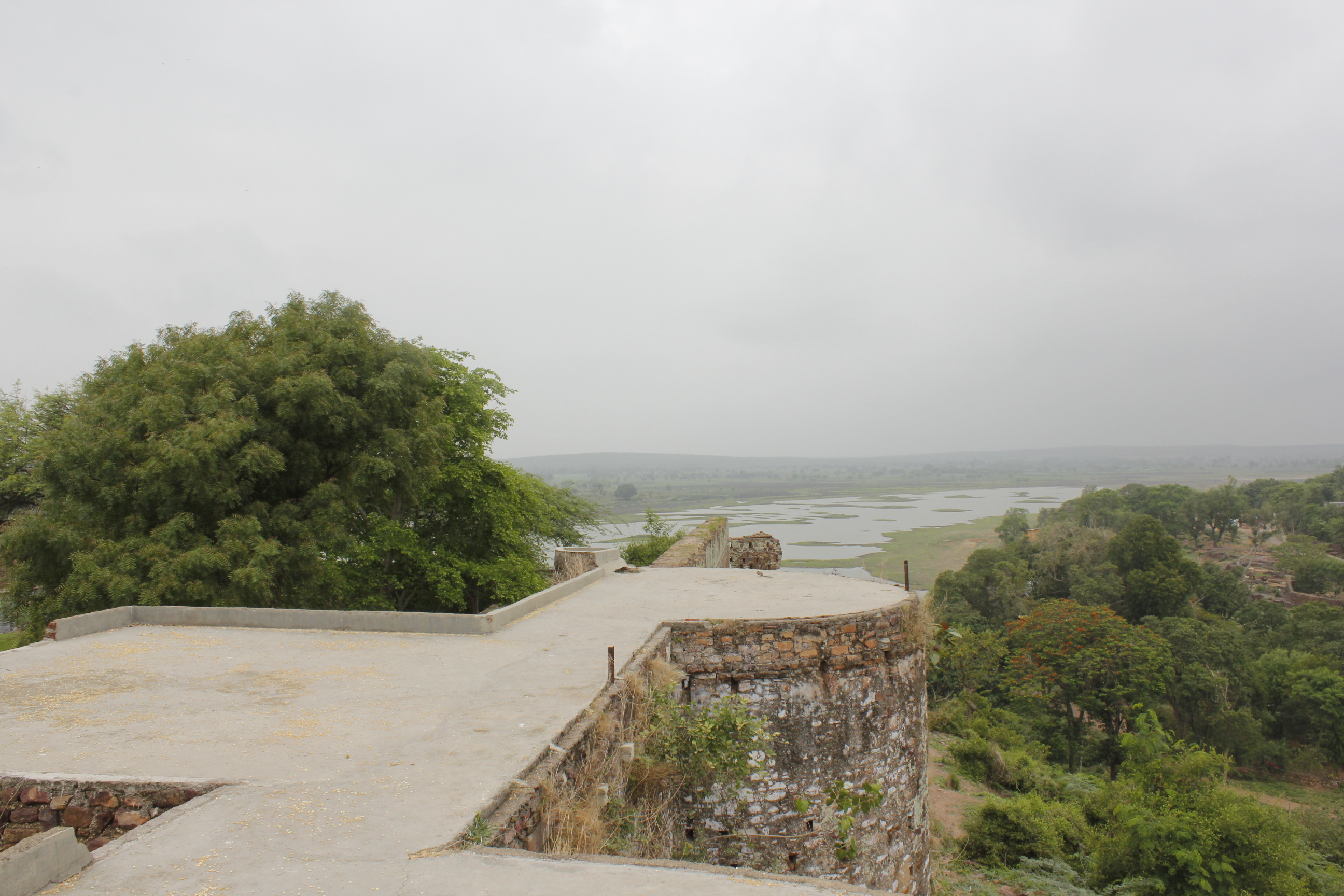
- View from the Jeeran fort

- Location in Madhya Pradesh, India Jeeran (India)
- Coordinates: 24.32°N 74.88°E
- Country: India
- State: Madhya Pradesh
- District: Neemuch
- Elevation: 473 m (1,552 ft)

Population (2011)
  - Total: 11,518

Languages
  - Official: Hindi, Malvi, English
- Time zone: UTC+5:30 (IST)
- PIN: 458336
- Telephone code: 91-7423

Jeeran is a town and a nagar panchayat in Neemuch district in the Indian state of Madhya Pradesh. It is located at 21 km south of the Neemuch.

== History ==
Much of history is not available, but being a part of Malwa, its history resembles the history of Malwa. From 1947 to 30 June 1998 it was in Mandsaur district, but after it has comes under Neemuch district due to formation of new district Neemuch. The town also has a big fort around 300 to 400 years old. this is called as Garhi of Jeeran. The Garhi of Jeeran was the site of a battle between the rebels under Shahzada Firoz Shah (sent to besiege the fort of Neemuch) and the contingent force stationed at Jeeran. Though the latter were defeated but the day was saved for the British by the timely arrival of colonel Durand and his men.

== Geography ==
Jeeran is located at 24.32°N 74.88°E. It has an average elevation of 1551 feet (473 metres).It is a part of Malwa plateau. Jeeran has also a big pond from which people serve their needs. The nearest big city is Neemuch from Jeeran, where can be reached by bus. There is no railway station in Jeeran, the nearest are Harkiyakhal and Malhargarh.

== Demographics ==
As of 2011, Jeeran had a population of 11,518. Males constitute 50% of the population and females 50%. Jeeran has an average literacy rate of 62%, higher than the national average of 59.5%: male literacy is 77%, and female literacy is 46%. In Jeeran, 14% of the population is under 6 years of age. People of various communities lives with each other with peace. There is a no record of any communal violence in the town. The town have two national Banks, Central Bank of India and state Bank of India and there are two ATM booth Central Bank of India and SBI. Malvi is the most commonly used language, But people understand Hindi as well. English is also known but can not speak.

== Economy ==
Agriculture is the occupation of Most of the people. The region is a part of one of the important producers of opium in the world.
Important Crops:-

- Wheat
- Maize
- Groundnut
- Gram
- Garlic
- Soybean
- Oured
- Mustard
- Posta

== Education ==
There are many Private schools apart from Government School in the town. All these schools are affiliated to M.P. Board. Patidar Higher Secondary is the oldest Private school of Jeeran, which has produced many brilliant students in the field of engineering, medical and administration. Today there are several schools which provide good education. Gyan Sarovar higher secondary is the only private school which gives education of 11th and 12th stds. In town there is not a single college. Also there is a newly govt college which one is giving better education and helpful for other nearby villages. Before 1990 people used to go by bicycle to Nemuch for college studies, as there was no public transport and people did not have motor vehicle. Jeeran has many Engineers, Doctors, CA and soldier person in army, BSF, CRPF which has shine the name of town.

== Gallery ==
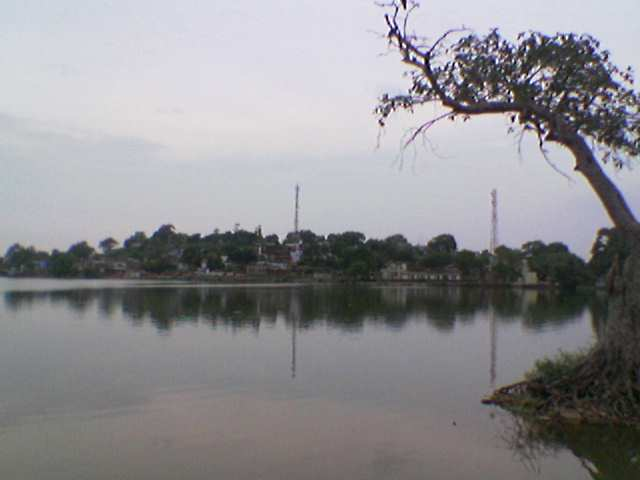
The above picture is of the bank of the Jeeran Pond. It also shows two telephone towers.

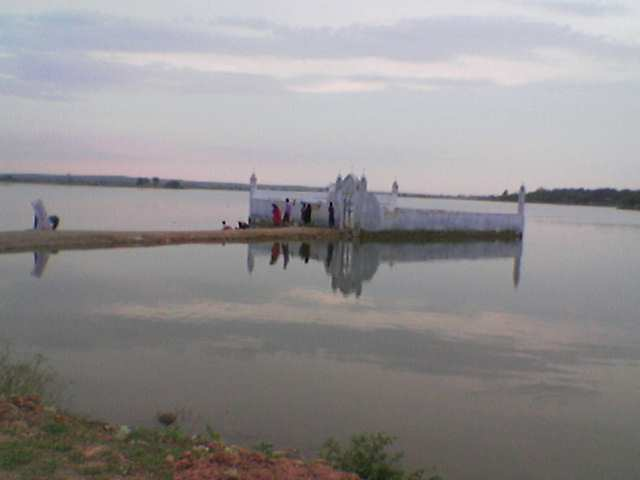

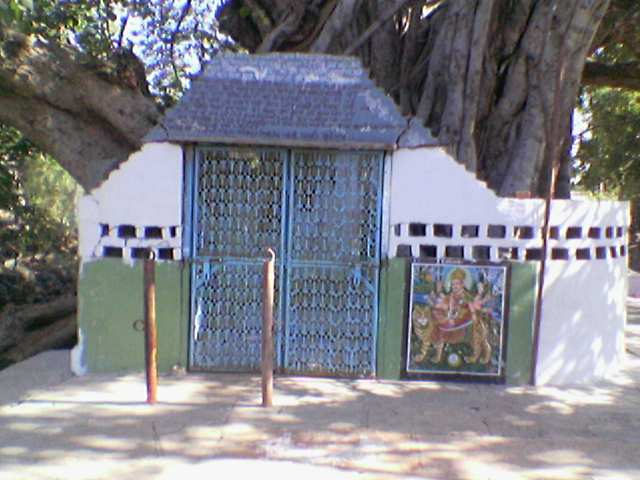

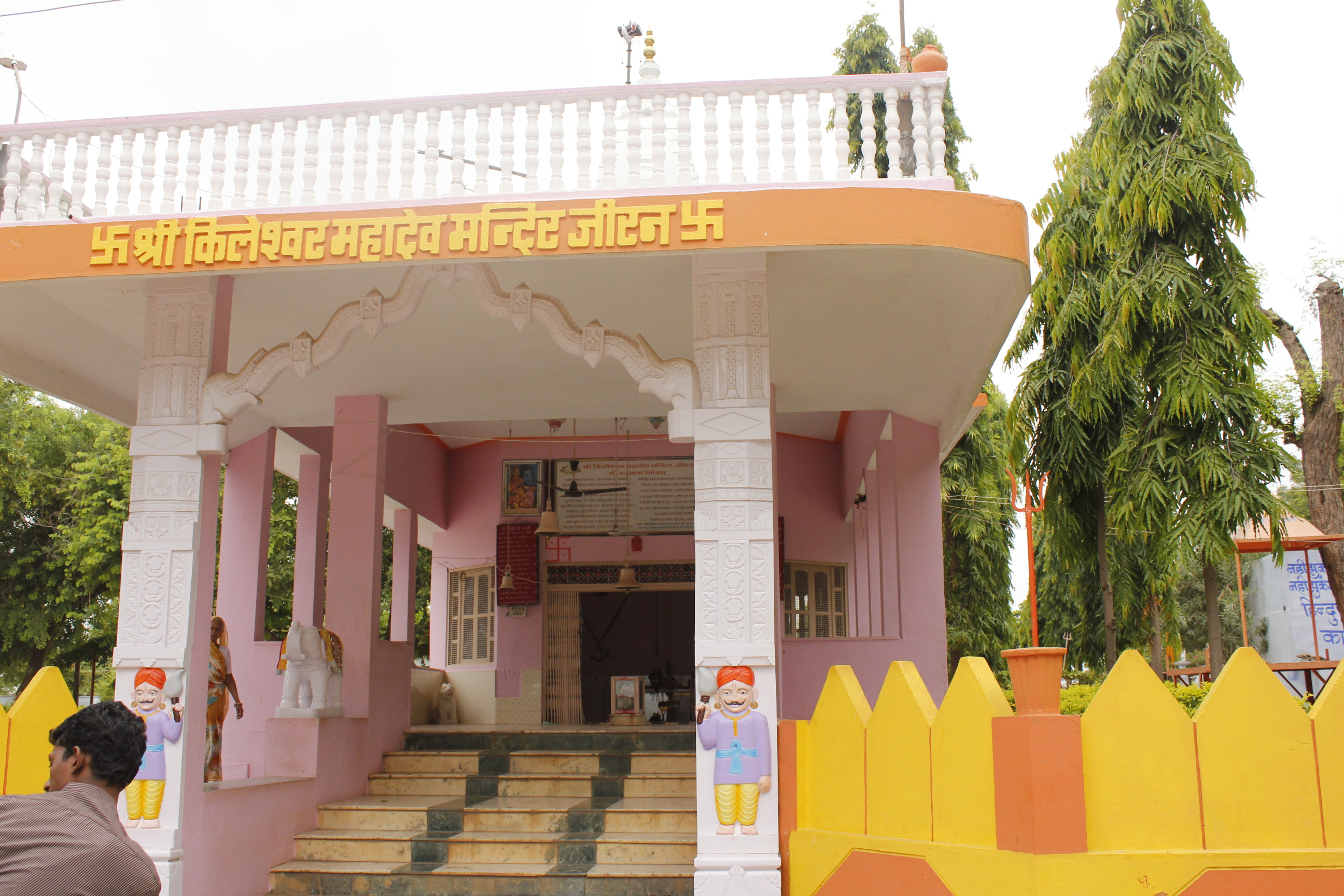
