= Dudarsi =

- village
- Location in Madhya Pradesh, India Dudarsi (India)
- Coordinates: 24.4788°N 74.8023°E
- Country: India
- State: Madhya Pradesh
- District: Neemuch

Languages
  - Official: Hindi
- Time zone: UTC+5:30 (IST)
- ISO 3166 code: IN-MP
- Vehicle registration: MP-50

Dudarsi is a village in Neemuch district of Madhya Pradesh state of India.
