= Opium and Alkaloid Works =

Indian government factories

The Government Opium and Alkaloid Factories (GOAF) is an Indian government-owned organisation. Its headquarter is located in New Delhi. The overall supervision of the organisation comes under the purview of Department of Revenue, Ministry of Finance.

== History ==
The input for factory is derived from licensed poppy cultivators in India from the states of Madhya Pradesh, Uttar Pradesh and Rajasthan. The entire produce is brought by government and supplied to GOAF. GOAF delivers the finished products such as alkaloids to the pharmaceutical industry.

In 2017, the Central Government of India started steps to privatize cultivation and processing of poppy in the country. A trial contract was awarded to a pharma company, Rusan Pharma Ltd and Embio limited to cultivate poppy over 2 hectares of land and extract the essence using a technology called concentrated poppy straw (CPS).

== Factories ==
There are two factories under the GOAF - Government Opium and Alkaloid Works, Ghazipur (U.P.) and Government Opium and Alkaloid Works, Neemuch (M.P.).

=== Government Opium and Alkaloid Works, Ghazipur (U.P.) ===
The Ghazipur factory began life as the Benaras Opium Agency, an entity of the East India Company, in 1820. The opium processed at Ghazipur was sent to Calcutta (now known as Kolkata) for auction, then shipped to the south China coast and smuggled into the country via the port of Canton (now known as Guangzhou). In 1945, the factory began extracting alkaloids in addition to processing opium. Currently, Sh. Rajendra Kumar, I.R.S. Additional GST Commissioner hold the additional charge of General Manager of this factory and Mr. O.P. Rai, I.R.S. is the Manager/ Asstt. Commissioner of factory along with the other official is currently posted in factory i.e Mr. Ajeet Kumar, C.L.S., Asst.Commissioner(central-Labour Welfare).The Ghazipur opium factory is mentioned in the novel "Sea of Poppies" by Amitav Ghosh. More recently both the Ghazipur and Nimach factories are referred to as sources of illegal smuggling for opium manufacture in the movie "Udta Punjab" (2016). This factory has connectivity with National Waterway 1. The factory was shut by UP Pollution Control Board in 2017 due to pollution issues and inferior affluent management practices.

=== Government Opium and Alkaloid Works, Neemuch (M.P.) ===
The Neemuch factory was founded in 1933. In 1976, it began extracting alkaloids in addition to processing opium. The Nimach factory, also known as Neemuch factory, is an acronym for Northern India Mounted Artillery and Cavalry Headquarters. The opium factory is known to have the largest opium receptacle in the world, resembling a large backyard swimming pool. It holds 450 tons of opium. The contents of the vat are stolen in the anti-heroin novel "White Monsoon" by Scott Nelson. In the novel, White Monsoon was a codename for a 1992 Libyan plot to pose as members of the International Red Cross and travel from Libya to India’s Opium and Alkaloid Works in Neemuch to steal the contents of a backyard swimming pool sized vat containing 450 tons of opium worth 36US billion in 1992. The opium would be converted to 40 tons of morphine base then smuggled into a remote location in Afghanistan to be converted to 40 tons of pure heroin to be sold for bargain-basement-prices on Main Street, America. Shri Naresh Bundel IRS is holding charge of General Manager of Government Opium & Alkaloid Works, Nimach. Shri Sanjay Kumar Rav (IRS) is the Manager of the Factory.

== Organization ==
After 1976, organisation is headed by the Chief Controller of Factories, currently Shri Anil Ramteke, IRS. The enterprise employs 1,432 people. Security is managed by members of the Central Industrial Security Force, with 123 assigned to the Ghazipur factory and 104 to Neemuch.
