= Aantri Mata =

Hindu temple in Madhya Pradesh, India

Religion
- Affiliation: Hinduism
- District: Neemuch
- Festivals: Navratri, Diwali

Location
- Location: Aantri Village, Manasa
- State: Madhya Pradesh
- Interactive map of Aantri Mata
- Coordinates: 24.3141°N 75.2300°E

Aantri Mata an ancient temple is located in Antri Mata village, about 35 km from Manasa Nagar in Neemuch District of Madhya Pradesh.The temple of Mata Aantri is built in the waterlogged area of Gandhi Sagar. Mother Goddess Antri is the Kuldevi of the Chandrawat Rajputs (Sisodia offshoots). On completion of the vow, devotees offer tongues to the goddess mother. Recognition and devotees claim that after offering the tongue, the tongue of the devotees comes automatically. Now, on the completion of the vow, many devotees have started offering silver tongues.

== History ==
Temple priest Bharat Singh Rathore says that the temple of the Mother Goddess is almost 700 years old. The temple of Goddess Maa is in the waterlogged area of Gandhi Sagar in Antri Mata village. On one side of the temple is the village and on the other three the Chambal river water is there. Devotees come from far and wide in Chaitra and Shardiya Navaratri to see and worship the Goddess. The people of MP-Rajasthan have great faith towards the Mother Goddess. According to the priest Rathore, the Mother Goddess fulfills all wishes and wishes. On completion of the vow, in 1964 Gulab Meghwal of the village of Antri Mata offered the tongue. Later his tongue came. After this, the order of offering tongues started in the temple. In this Navaratri also, talk of offering of tongues by about 4 devotees has come to the temple till now a large number of people have offered tongues to the Mother Goddess.
