= Balkavi Bairagi =

Indian politician and poet

Member of Parliament of Rajya Sabha from Madhya Pradesh
- In office 1998–2004

Member of Parliament of Lok Sabha from Madhya Pradesh
- In office 1984–1989

Cabinet Minister in Madhya Pradesh Government for Ministry of Food and Civil Supplies Ministry of Language and Tourism
- In office 1980–1985

Personal details
- Born: Nandram Das Bairagi; 10 February 1931 Manasa, Madhya Pradesh, British India
- Died: 13 May 2018 (aged 87) Manasa, Madhya Pradesh
- Party: Indian National Congress
- Parent: Mahant Dwarka Das Bairagi

Balkavi Bairagi (born Nand Ramdas Bairagi; 10 February 1931 – 13 May 2018) popularly known Rastrakavi Balkavi Bairagi was a Hindi poet, film lyricist and politician from India. His songs in Malvi, such as the very popular 'Panihari' (A woman carrying water) gave a stage to Malvi, a Hindi dialect spoken in the region of Malva (Malwa) in the mainstream Hindi poetry scenario. He was one of the several who have been hailed as a Rashtrakavi ('national poet'). He was a Member of Parliament, Rajya Sabha from Madhya Pradesh from 1998 to 2004.

== Early life and education ==
Bairagi was born in Manasa in a Vaishnav Brahmin (Bairagi) family. Originally named Nand Ramdas Bairagi, he came to be popularly called as "Balkavi" Bairagi as he wrote some classic poems during his childhood. He obtained his post-graduate degree in Hindi from Vikram University, Ujjain.

== Literary career ==
Bairagi wrote several Hindi poems and wrote prolifically for children. His poem "Jhar gaye paat, bisar gayi tehni" is considered a masterpiece by Hindi poets. He wrote lyrics for at least a dozen Hindi films, the most noted among them being Reshma aur Shera and Ankahee.

== Political career ==
As a politician affiliated to the Indian National Congress, he was elected to the Madhya Pradesh Legislative Assembly from Manasa in 1968 and again in 1980. At various points in time, he served as the Minister of State for Information, the Minister of Language and Tourism and the Minister of Food and Civil Supplies in the Madhya Pradesh Government. He was a Member of the Lok Sabha between 1984 and 1989, representing the Mandsaur constituency. He was a Rajya Sabha member from 1998 to 2004.

== Popular literary works ==
=== Representative poems ===
- Jhar gaye paat, bisar gayi tehni
- Apni gandh nahi bechoonga
- Deewat par deep
- Jo kutilta se jiyenge
- Mere desh ke laal
- Naujawan aao re
- Saara desh hamaara

=== Poems for children ===
- Vishwaas
- Chaand mein dhabba
- Chai banaao
- Aakaash
- Khud saagar ban jao
- Five poems for children-1
- Five poems for children- 2
- Five poems for children- 3

=== Filmography ===
Song title	Movie name	Year
Mujhko bhi radha bana le nandlaal	Ankahee	1985
Har sannata kuch kehta hai	Jadu Tona	1977
Nimbua pe ao mere ambua pe ao	Veer Chhatrasaal	1971

== Famous poems ==
=== झर गये पात,बिसर गई टहनी (The leaves have fallen, the branches have been forgotten) ===
झर गये पात

बिसर गई टहनी

करुण कथा जग से क्या कहनी ?

नव कोंपल के आते-आते

टूट गये सब के सब नाते

राम करे इस नव पल्लव को

पड़े नहीं यह पीड़ा सहनी

झर गये पात

बिसर गई टहनी

करुण कथा जग से क्या कहनी ?

कहीं रंग है, कहीं राग है

कहीं चंग है, कहीं फ़ाग है

और धूसरित पात नाथ को

टुक-टुक देखे शाख विरहनी

झर गये पात

बिसर गई टहनी

करुण कथा जग से क्या कहनी ?

पवन पाश में पड़े पात ये

जनम-मरण में रहे साथ ये

"वृन्दावन" की श्लथ बाहों में

समा गई ऋतु की "मृगनयनी"

झर गये पात

बिसर गई टहनी

करुण कथा जग से क्या कहनी ?

== Death and legacy ==
He died in his sleep on 13 May 2018 at the age of 87 years. His legacy is continued by two sons and numerous grandchildren. He is remembered as one of the most popular and reputed poets of Hindi language.
