= Welspun Solar MP project =

Solar project in India

Bhagwanpura Solar Power Plant
- Official name: Welspun Solar MP
- Country: India
- Location: Madhya Pradesh
- Coordinates: 24.6907°N 75.1347°E
- Status: Operational
- Construction began: 2013
- Commission date: February 2014

Solar farm
- Type: Flat-panel PV
- Site area: 305 ha (754 acres)

Power generation
- Nameplate capacity: 151 MW (130 MW_{AC})

External links
- Website: www.welspunenergy.com

The Welspun Solar MP project is a 151 megawatt (MW) photovoltaic power station located in Bhagwanpura village, just south of Diken, in the Jawad tehsil of Neemuch district, Madhya Pradesh, central India.

Operational since February 2014, it is one of the largest solar power projects in India. The Welspun Solar MP project was constructed at a cost of 1,100 crore rupees (about $182 million) on 305 hectares (750 acres) of land. It supplies power at a rate of 8.05 rupees per kW·h (13,31 cents/kW·h). Welspun Energy Ltd. (WEL) built the plant through its subsidiary, Welspun Solar Madhya Pradesh Private Limited (WSMPPL). The project mitigates 216,372 tonnes of carbon emissions annually and power to 624,000 homes.

The average capacity utilization factor of these solar plants is significantly above the CREC's 19% norm. The solar PV modules use polycrystalline silicon photovoltaic technology, each with a module capacity of a 235 W_{p}, and are connected to inverters with an output of 630 kW_{e} each. The generated electricity is exported to the regional North-East-West-North East (NEWNE) electricity grid in India, after being stepped up to 132 kV.

The site, situated on a 500-meter-high barren land ridge, receives some of the highest irradiation levels in India, with a measured DNI (Direct Normal Irradiance) of about 2076 kW·h/m^{2}. The expected lifetime of the solar PV power plant is 25 years.

== See also ==
- Solar power in India
- List of photovoltaic power stations
- Photovoltaics
- Renewable energy
- Solar energy
