= Bhadbhadiya =

Village in Madhya Pradesh

- Village
- Location in Madhya Pradesh, India Bhadbhadiya (India)
- Coordinates: 24.5257°N 74.8675°E
- Country: India
- State: Madhya Pradesh
- District: Neemuch

Population (2011)
  - Total: 3,905

Languages
- Time zone: UTC+5:30 (IST)
- PIN: 458441

Bhadbhadiya, also written Bharbhadiya, is a gram panchayat village within the Neemuch district of Madhya Pradesh, India.
