= Rampura, Neemuch =

Rampura
- Town
- Location in Madhya Pradesh, India
- Coordinates: 24.47°N 75.43°E
- Country: India
- State: Madhya Pradesh
- District: Neemuch
- Elevation: 508 m (1,667 ft)

Population (2001)
  - Total: 17,761

Languages
  - Official: Hindi
- Time zone: UTC+5:30 (IST)
- Vehicle registration: MP 44

Rampura is a town and Nagar Parishad, near Neemuch town in the Neemuch district of the Indian state of Madhya Pradesh. Rampura was founded by Rama bhil. Mahagarh was also ruled by Bhil king, Rama was King but after the defeat against Chandrawats of Mewar, the town of Rampura was under their control until the independence of India.

== Geography ==
Rampura is located at 24.47°N 75.43°E. It has an average elevation of 508 metres (1667 feet). It comes under the Malwa Region on the Malwa Plateau.

== Demographics ==
As of the 2001 India census, Rampura had a population of 17,761. Males constitute 52% of the population and females 48%; 14% of the population is under 6 years of age. Rampura has an average literacy rate of 64%, higher than the national average of 59.5%: male literacy is 75%, and female literacy is 53%

== Tourist Places ==
- Gandhisagar Dam
- Kedareshwar Mahadev Temple

Religious Places

• Syedi Bawa Mulla Khan Saheb Mazar

== Transportation ==
Rampura is 60 km away from district headquarters Neemuch.

Nearest airport is Maharana Pratap Airport Udaipur.
