= Neemuch district =

Coordinates: 24°28′12″N 74°52′12″E

- District of Madhya Pradesh
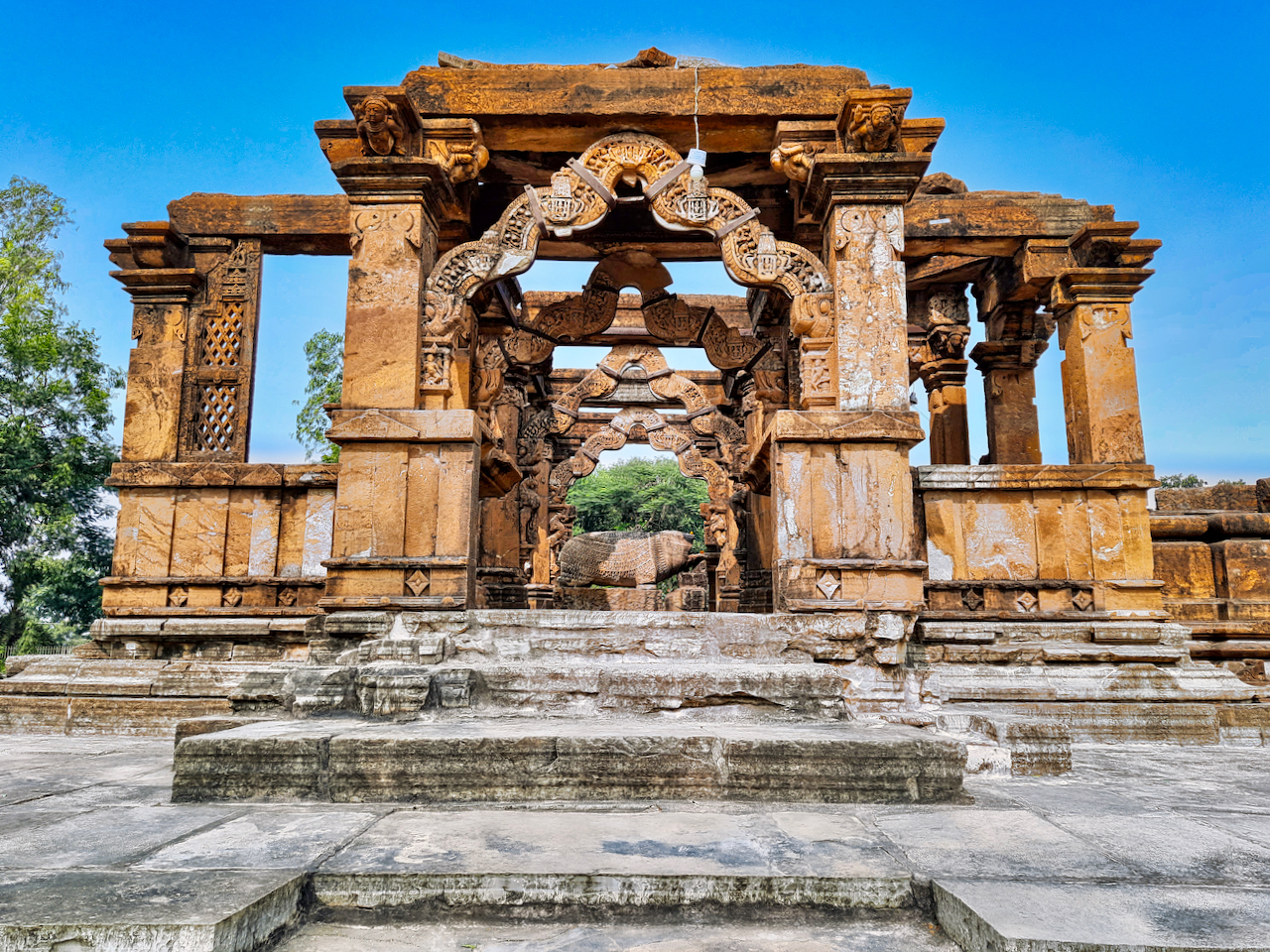
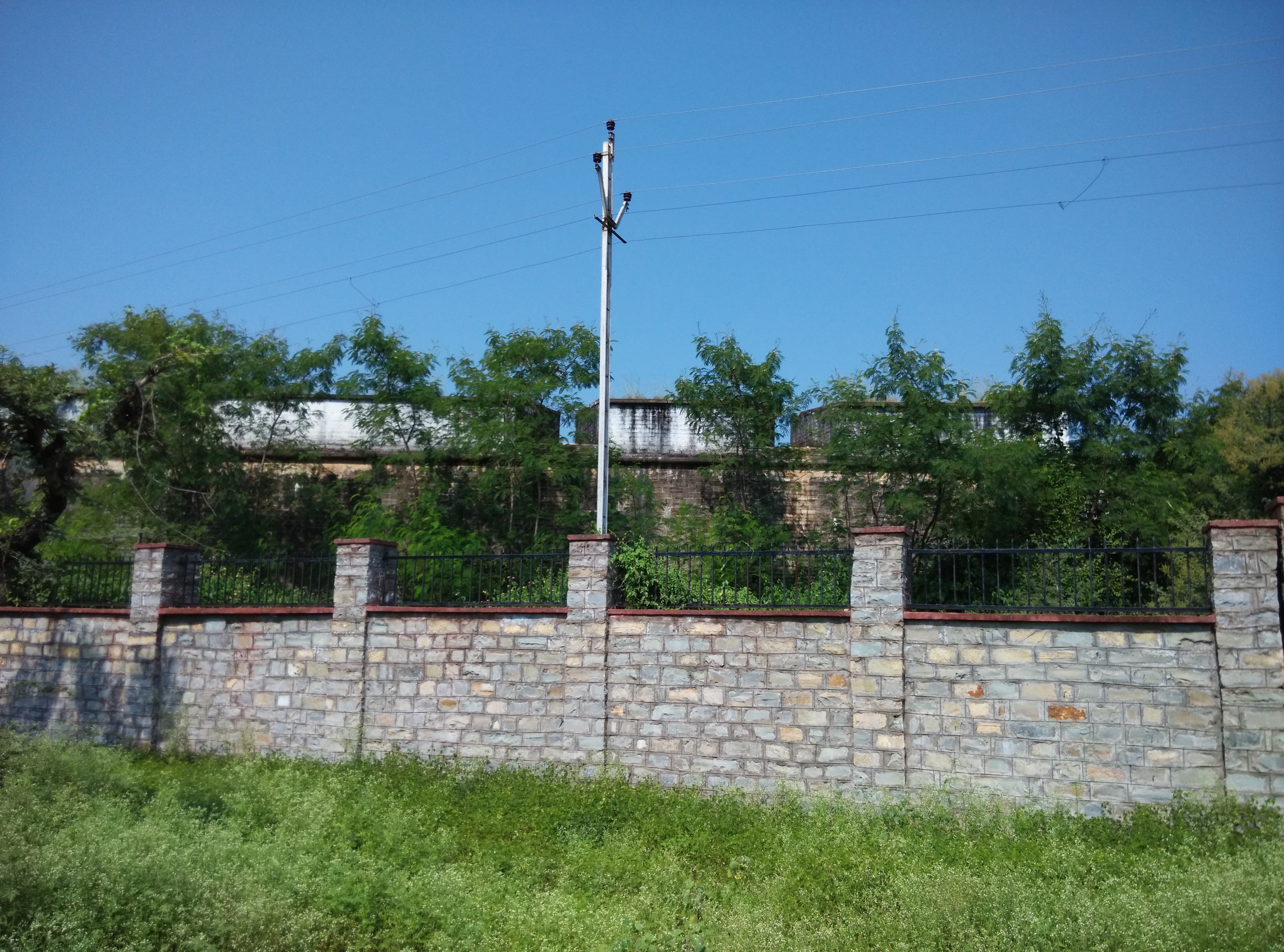
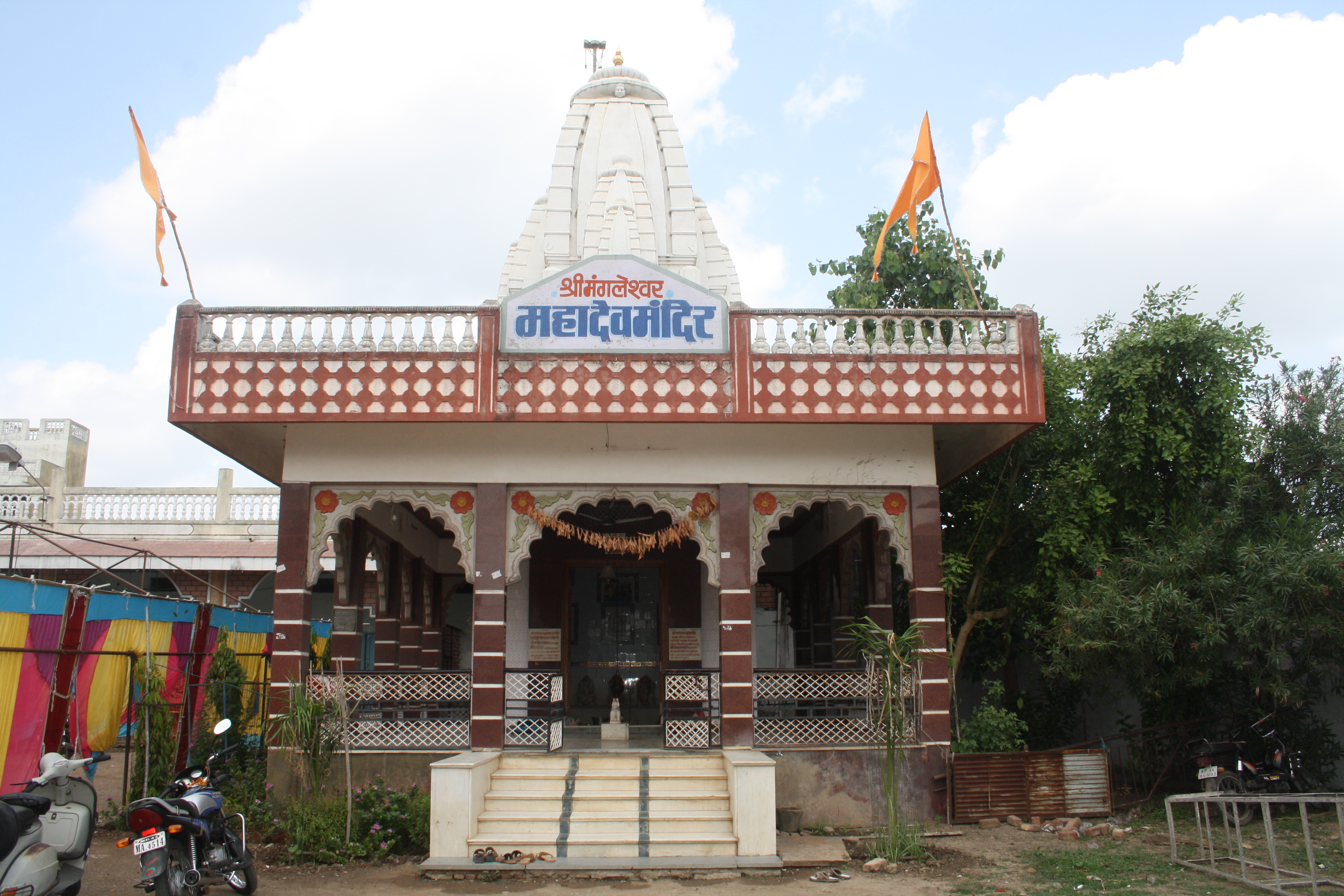
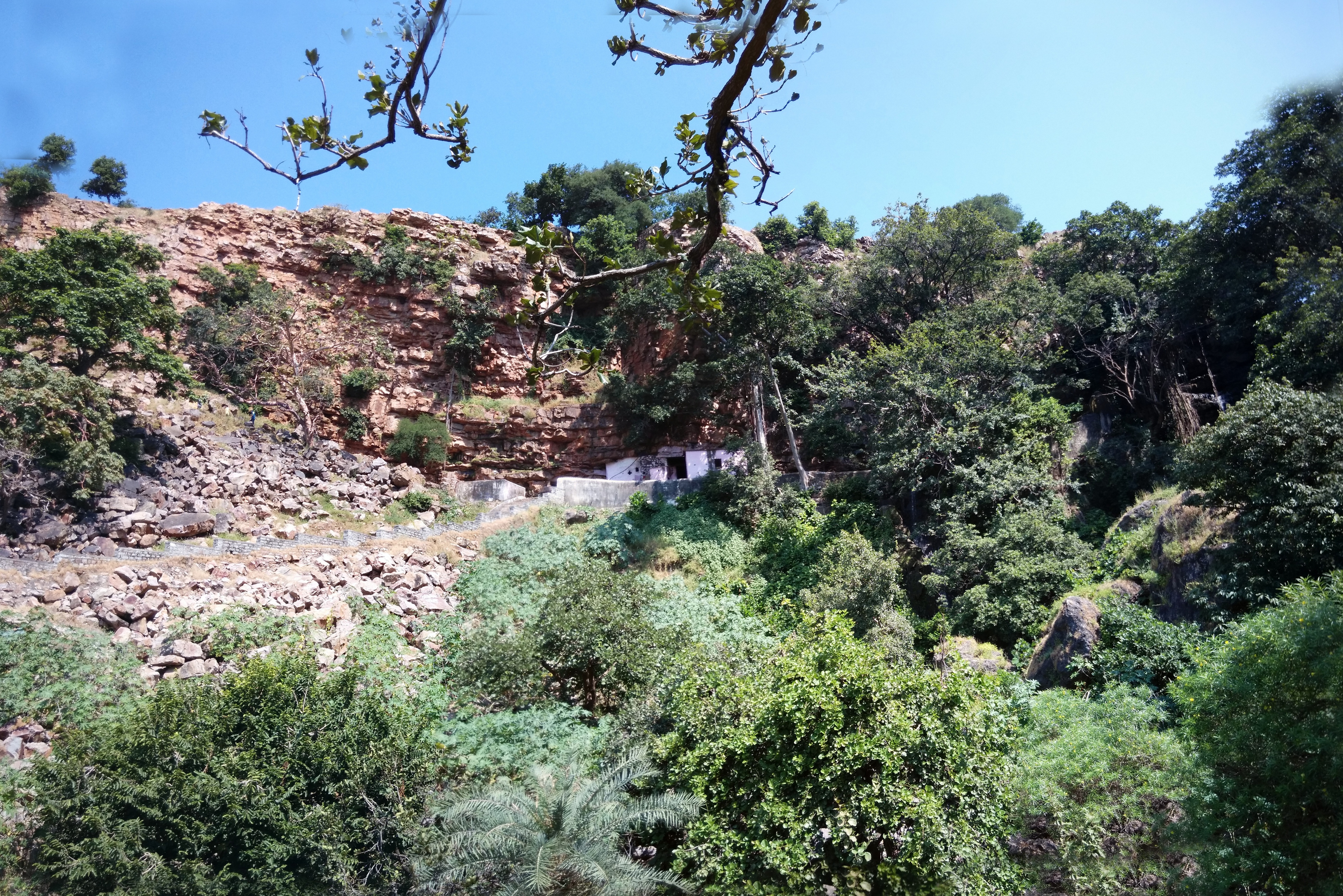
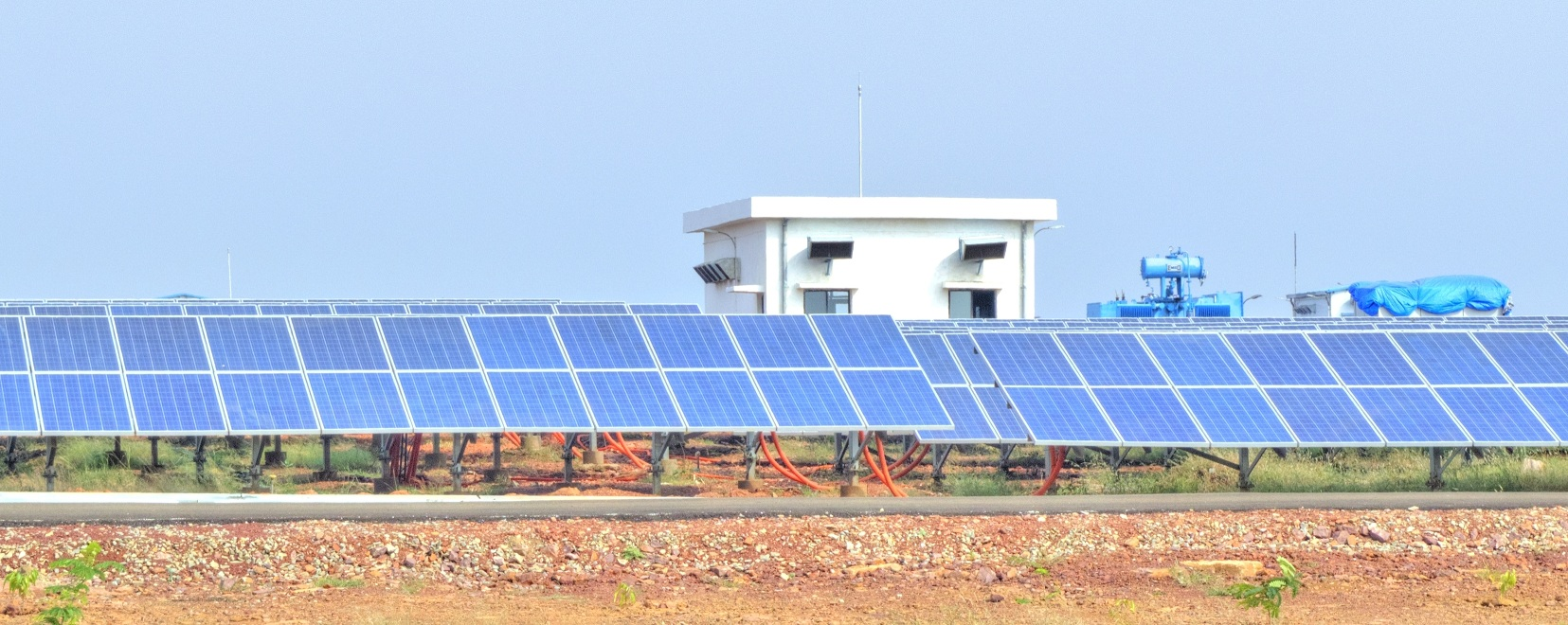
- Clockwise from top-left: Nava Toran Temple in Khor, Neemuch British fort, hills near Sukhanand Dham, Welspun Solar Power Plant, Shiva Temple in Manasa

- Location of Neemuch district in Madhya Pradesh
- Country: India
- State: Madhya Pradesh
- Division: Ujjain
- Headquarters: Neemuch
- Tehsils: 1. Neemuch; 2. Jiran; 3. Jawad; 4. Manasa; 5. Singoli; 6. Rampura

Government
  - Collector: Mr. Mayank Agrawal IAS
  - Lok Sabha constituencies: Mandsaur (shared with Mandsaur district)
  - Vidhan Sabha constituencies: 1. Manasa, 2. Neemuch and 3. Jawad

Area
  - Total: 3,875 km^{2} (1,496 sq mi)

Population (2011)
  - Total: 826,067
  - Density: 213.2/km^{2} (552.1/sq mi)

Demographics
  - Literacy: 71.81 per cent
  - Sex ratio: 959
- Time zone: UTC+05:30 (IST)
- Major highways: NH 79
- Website: neemuch.nic.in

Neemuch district (Hindi pronunciation: [n̪iːmət͡ʃ]) is one of the 55 districts of Madhya Pradesh state in central India. The town of Neemuch is the administrative headquarters of the district.Neemuch district is located West Northern part of Madhya Pradesh.

Asia's largest solar power plant, inaugurated by Narendra Modi, as BJP's prime ministerial candidate Welspun Solar MP project operating since February, 2014 at Neemuch. It is a 151 megawatt) photovoltaic power station constructed at a cost of 1100 crore rupees (about $182,000,000) on 305 hectares (750 acres) of land.

Neemuch district is part of Ujjain Division and had 726,070 inhabitants as of 2001, rising to 826,067 as of 2011. Neemuch district is bordered by Rajasthan state on the west and north, and by Mandsaur district to the east and south.

== History ==
This district was created on 30 June 1998 by separating Neemuch, Manasa and Jawad tehsils of the erstwhile Mandsaur district. During the British rule, the district headquarters Neemuch was a cantonment town, known as the North India Mounted Artillery and Cavalry Headquarters (NIMACH). It was later converted into the headquarters of the Crown's Representative Police Force in 1939.

== Economy ==
Neemuch economy is driven by agriculture produce trading, service sector like CRPF (Central Reserve Police Force), Cement plants like Vikram Cements of Aditya Birla Group and remittance from thousands of migrants all over the country. In fact this small town is native to many senior corporate professionals including CEO of companies like Wipro, Key management professionals at Reliance Industries, Grasim and many IITians and doctors.

It is also home town of once famous Agarwal Classes, Mumbai for IITs. The owner GD Agarwal has established an eye hospital Gomabai Darbarilal Agarwal, The hospital is considered as best place in region for eyes and has also established Neemuch with highest eye donation in region.

It is one of the largest producers of opium in the world. Other agriculture products are wheat, garlic, oilseeds, herbs like Ashwagandha and have very active agriculture market.

== Demographics ==
Historical population
Year	Pop.	±% p.a.
1901	127,363	—
1911	143,671	+1.21%
1921	148,658	+0.34%
1931	168,704	+1.27%
1941	198,959	+1.66%
1951	232,846	+1.59%
1961	284,490	+2.02%
1971	368,203	+2.61%
1981	488,118	+2.86%
1991	598,339	+2.06%
2001	726,070	+1.95%
2011	826,067	+1.30%

Religions in Neemuch district (2011)
Religion	Percent
Hinduism	89.74%
Islam	8.15%
Jainism	1.71%
Other or not stated	0.40%

According to the 2011 census Neemuch District has a population of 826,067, roughly equal to the US state of South Dakota. This gives it a ranking of 477th in India (out of a total of 640).

The district has a population density of 194 inhabitants per square kilometre (500/sq mi). Its population growth rate over the decade 2001-2011 was 13.76%. Neemuch has a sex ratio of 959 females for every 1000 males, and a literacy rate of 71.81%. 29.69% of the population lives in urban areas. Scheduled Castes and Scheduled Tribes make up 13.46% and 8.65% of the population respectively.

Languages of Neemuch district (2011)
1. Malvi (46.3%)
2. Hindi (41.6%)
3. Mewari (3.61%)
4. Banjari (2.98%)
5. Rajasthani (1.61%)
6. Urdu (1.15%)
7. Others (2.74%)

At the time of the 2011 Census of India, 46.29% of the population in the district spoke Malvi, 41.62% Hindi, 3.61% Mewari, 2.98% Banjari, 1.61% Rajasthani, 1.15% Urdu and 0.67% Gujarati as their first language.

Name	Status	District	City of Outgrowth	Population Census 1991	Population Census 2001	Population Census 2011
Neemuch	Municipality	Neemuch	Neemuch	86,439	107,663	128,095
Manasa	Nagar Panchayat	Neemuch		19,034	22,623	26,551
Rampura	Nagar Panchayat	Neemuch		15,848	17,757	18,364
Jawad	Nagar Panchayat	Neemuch		14,228	16,687	17,129
Kukdeshwar	Nagar Panchayat	Neemuch		...	10,793	11,956
Jiran	Nagar Panchayat	Neemuch		9,321	10,523	11,518
Singoli	Nagar Panchayat	Neemuch		6,606	8,316	9,523
Ratangarh	Nagar Panchayat	Neemuch		5,811	7,004	7,994
Diken	Nagar Panchayat	Neemuch		6,042	7,208	7,951
Khor	Census Town	Neemuch		...	5,665	5,683
Kumaria	Ward of Outgrowth	Neemuch	Neemuch	...	...	466

== Tourist places ==
- Gandhi Sagar Sanctuary
- Aantari Mata Mandir
- Bhadwa Mata, Mandir
- Nava Toran Temple
- Sukhanand Sagar Dam
- Sukhanand Dham

== See also ==
- Bhadbhadiya
- Dudarsi
- Indore
- Ujjain division
