= Virendra Kumar Sakhlecha =

10th Chief Minister of Madhya Pradesh

10th Chief Minister of Madhya Pradesh
- In office 18 January 1978 – 19 January 1980
- Preceded by: Kailash Chandra Joshi
- Succeeded by: Sunderlal Patwa

Deputy Chief Minister of Madhya Pradesh
- In office 30 July 1967 – 12 March 1969
- Chief Minister: Govind Narayan Singh
- Preceded by: Office Established
- Succeeded by: Shiv Bhanu Singh Solanki

Leader of the Opposition Madhya Pradesh Legislative Assembly
- In office 1962–1967
- Chief Minister: Bhagwantrao Mandloi; Dwarka Prasad Mishra
- Preceded by: Chandra Pratap Tiwari
- Succeeded by: Shyama Charan Shukla

Member of Parliament Rajya Sabha
- In office 10 April 1972 – 26 June 1977
- Succeeded by: Mama Baleshwar Dayal
- Constituency: Madhya Pradesh

Member of Madhya Pradesh Legislative Assembly
- In office 1977–1985
- Preceded by: Kanhiyalal Nagauri
- Succeeded by: Chunnilal Dhakad
- Constituency: Jawad
- In office 1957–1972
- Preceded by: seat established
- Succeeded by: Kanhiyalal Nagauri
- Constituency: Jawad

Personal details
- Born: 4 March 1930 Mandsaur, Central India Agency, British India
- Died: 31 May 1999 (aged 69) Bhopal, Madhya Pradesh, India
- Party: Bharatiya Janata Party
- Spouse: Chetan Devi Sakhlecha
- Children: 4

Virendra Kumar Sakhlecha (4 March 1930 – 31 May 1999) was an Indian politician who served as the 10th Chief Minister Of Madhya Pradesh from 18 January 1978 to 19 January 1980. He was a leader of the Bharatiya Janata Party. He hailed from Neemuch District (then part of Mandsaur district). The Govt. Medical College in Neemuch was named after him in 2024.

== Career ==
Sakhlecha was born on 4 March 1930. He came close to the Rashtriya Swayamsevak Sangh at a tender age and joined Sangh in 1945.

He was made Leader of the Opposition in the Madhya Pradesh Legislative Assembly in 1962 by Kushabhau Thakre when Jana Sangh won 41 MLAs to the 288-seat assembly.

In 1967, Govind Narayan Singh an Indian National Congress candidate along with Vijayaraje Scindia rebelled against Dwarka Prasad Mishra and formed a new political party known as the Lok Sewak Dal and became the Chief Minister of Madhya Pradesh as the leader of a coalition, known as the Samyukta Vidhayak Dal which included Jana Sangh also. Sakhlecha was named the Deputy Chief Minister of the state from 30 July 1967 to 12 March 1969.

In the 1972 Madhya Pradesh Legislative Assembly election, he lost an election to Kanhiyalal Nagauri a Congress candidate. Sakhlecha was sent to Rajya Sabha. During the Indian Emergency, he went to jail under Maintenance of Internal Security Act.

Post Emergency, Kailash Joshi was made the Chief Minister of Madhya Pradesh and Sakhalecha became number two in the government but in January 1978, Sakhalecha became Chief Minister of Madhya Pradesh.

In January 1980, Jana Sangh removed Sakhalecha and replaced Sundar Lal Patwa as Chief Minister which lasted for 28 days as Indira Gandhi returned to the center and sacked the Patwa government in Madhya Pradesh.

Due to in-fightings with Patwa, Sakhlecha left the newly formed version of Jana Sangh called Bharatiya Janata Party, Sakhalecha formed his own party called Madhya Pradesh Janata Party. He lost 1985 Madhya Pradesh Legislative Assembly election to Chunnilal Dhakad of Indian National Congress.

Sakhlecha returned to Bharatiya Janata Party in 1990 with condition that no post will be given to him.

During 1998 Madhya Pradesh Legislative Assembly election, he rebelled against Bharatiya Janata Party as he was refused a ticket and contested the poll as an independent. He lost the election from Jawad to Ghanshyam Patidar of Indian National Congress by 8,893 votes. He died on 31 May 1999. After his death, his son Om Prakash Sakhlecha won many elections on BJP ticket.

== Personal life ==
Sakhlecha was a criminal barrister. As a strong advocate of 'clean politics,' he helped expand the Bharatiya Jana Sangh. His son Om Prakash Sakhlecha is also a leader of the Bharatiya Janata Party and is in his third term as an MLA from the Madhya Pradesh Assembly.

== See also ==
- Virendra Kumar Sakhlecha ministry (1978–1980)
