= Sitaram Jajoo =

Indian politician

Member of the Madhya Pradesh Parliament for Neemuch Vidhan Sabha
- In office 1952–1956

Personal details
- Born: 29 May 1915
- Died: 25 November 1983 (aged 68)
- Occupation: Politician

Sitaram Surajmal Jajoo (29 May 1915 – 25 November 1983) was an Indian politician from the state of the Madhya Pradesh. Did Ll.B. from Allahabad University c 1939. Freedom Fighter 1942. Member Constituent Assembly of India 1950. Member of provisional Parliament (1947–1952).

He represented Neemuch Vidhan Sabha constituency in Madhya Bharat(1952–1956). Minister to the Government of Madhya Bharat (1952–1956) & Madhya Pradesh (1956–1962). Minister to Government of Madhya Pradesh 1956. Legislative Assembly by winning General election of 1952 & 1957. Chairman Madhya Pradesh State Road Transport Corporation (1972–1977).
