= Sukhanand Dham =

- सुखानंद (Hindi)
- Sukhanand ji
- Type: Historic place of Preaching and Worship
- Location: Sukhanand Village, Jawad
- Nearest city: Jawad

History
- Founder: Sukhanand Swami
- Original use: Preaching

Site notes
- Elevation: 452 m (1,483 ft)
- Sculptor: Shiva Linga
- Current use: Worship
- Governing body: Government of India
- Visitors: 50,000

Sukhanand Dham or Sukhanand ji is located at a distance of about 12 km (7.5 mi) from the city of Jawad, which is more of an ancient rock-cave that is located on the border of the Rajasthan State. This ashram is said to be built by Sukhdev Swami. This ashram also consists of a temple dedicated to Lord Shiva and it is wholly surrounded by the mountains and a waterfall and Sukhanand Sagar Dam nearby.

== History ==
"Shree Sukhanand" the name is on the name of an old saint. Sree Sukhanand ji was an saint in old time who was living in the place where now a temple of God Shiva is situated with shivaling near by that one small temple of shree Sukhanand is situated in Jawad tehsil of Neemuch district Madhya pradesh.

== Major occasion ==
Sukhanand is considered to be a holy place. It also becomes a major point of attraction for tourist in Neemuch area and its subsidiary local villages. It is considered as mostly crowded on Hariyali Amavasya comes in rainy season where the thing like Fair is organised by the local authorities.
