= Bhadwamata =

Religion
- Affiliation: Hinduism
- District: Neemuch
- Festivals: Navratri, Diwali

Location
- State: Madhya Pradesh
- Country: India
- Interactive map of Bhadwamata
- Coordinates: 24.4724°N 75.0443°E

Architecture
- Temple: 1

Website
- http://www.bhadwamata.org/

Bhadwamata or Bhadvamata is a temple in the Neemuch district of Madhya Pradesh.
