= Kailash Chawla =

Indian politician

Kailash Chawla is an Indian politician and leader of the Bharatiya Janta Party from Madhya Pradesh. He is a member of the Madhya Pradesh Legislative Assembly, elected from Mandsaur district. He served as cabinet minister in Patwa ministry.
