= Manasa, Madhya Pradesh =

Manasa
- Town
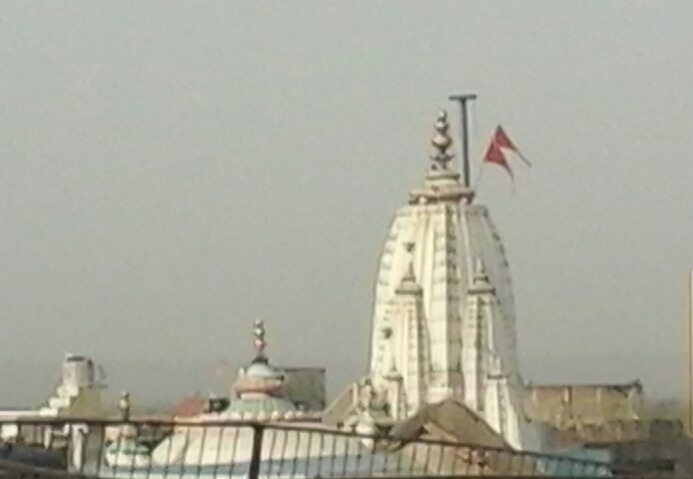
- Badrivishal Temple, Manasa
- Nickname: Mandiron Ki Nagri
- Location in Madhya Pradesh, India
- Coordinates: 24.48°N 75.15°E
- Country: India
- State: Madhya Pradesh
- District: Neemuch

Government
  - Body: Nagar Panchayat

Area
  - Total: 2.76 km^{2} (1.07 sq mi)
- Elevation: 439 m (1,440 ft)

Population (2011)
  - Total: 26,551
  - Density: 9,620/km^{2} (24,900/sq mi)

Languages
  - Official: Hindi
  - Native: Malvi
- Time zone: UTC+5:30 (IST)
- PIN: 458110
- Telephone code: 07421
- Vehicle registration: MP-44

Manasa is a town with nagar panchayat in Neemuch district in the Indian state of Madhya Pradesh. It was under the princely state of Holker before Indian independence. This state was settled by Masania shepherds.

== History ==
It is a major town in Neemuch district of Madhya Pradesh. Manasa is a seat of the legislative assembly. It is tehsil headquarters. The town is well connected by road from Mandsaur, Neemuch and also to Kota via Bhanpura. It was under the princely state of Holker before independence.

== Places of worship ==
Many temples and mosques are found across Manasa.

=== Temples ===
The town is famous for its number of temples.

Some of its temples are:
Name of temple	Address in Manasa	Image
Shri Badrivishal Mandir	Ghandhi Chock	Top view of the Badrivishal Mandir
Sai Mandir	Police Colony	Sai Temple, Manasa
Shiv Mandir	Dwarikapuri	A street view image showing the front building of Shiv Mandir which is in Dwarikapuri

=== Mosques ===
The town has two major mosques:

- Bohra Mazid
- Muslim mosque

== Monuments ==
There is a famous monument in Manasa which is known as Vijay Stamba (Vijay Sthamb). It is made of white polished marble and is 1.7 m (5 ft 7 in) tall. It lies at the intersection of Sadar Bazar Road and City Hospital Road, near Sabzi Mandi (Vegetable Market) and also near the famous temple Shree Manshapurn Mahadev Madir. It is in front of the famous Baser ji ka baada. Vijay Stamba denotes for Victory, as its meaning is The Pillar of Victory. It was built in 1960, i.e. 13 years after independence.

== Geography ==
Manasa is located at 24.48°N 75.15°E. It has an average elevation of 439 metres (1440 feet). It comes under the Malwa Region on the Malwa Plateau.

=== Soil ===
The soils in the Manasa Tehsil are generally of four types: medium deep black cotton soil, red loamy soil, laterite soil and alluvial soil. Black cotton soil is derived from weathering and disintegration of basaltic lava flow. Most of the district is covered by medium deep black soil. Red loamy soil consists of sandy loam to clayey loam and is brick in colour. This soil is derived from Vindhyan sandstone and shale and occurring in the valley portion on the plateau and adjacent to hill composed of Vindhyan sandstone. This type of soil covers a northern part of the district. Laterite soil dark brown to pink coloured lateritic soil is found as capping over hillocks of basaltic terrain. Alluvial soils are grayish yellow to brownish yellow in colour and are found along the major rivers.

==== Crops ====
The tehsil is famous for crops of opium (affem) and soybean.

=== Nature and surroundings ===
Outer parts of the town are surrounded with large agricultural farmlands.

==== Gardens and parks ====
There are two gardens and one park in Manasa:

Name	Pigeons	Rabbits	Tortoise	Slides/swings	Benches	Charge
Kachua Garden	No	Yes	Yes	Some	yes	Free
Vrandavan Garden	yes	No	No	Many	Yes	Free
Usha Ganj Park	Yes	Yes	Yes	No	Yes	Free

==== Water sources ====
Manasa has two major ponds. Rampira Talab lies in the Neemuch Naka, visible from MP SH 31A and also from Dhakani Road. Manasa Talai lies on Mandsaur Naka near the temple of God Shani Dev. It is visible from Mandsaur Road.

Many other ponds are found within and around the tehsil of Manasa.

== Transport ==
Manasa is well connected by roads. Madhya Pradesh State Highway 31A passes from here.

There are basic transport facilities in Manasa.

=== Bus transport ===
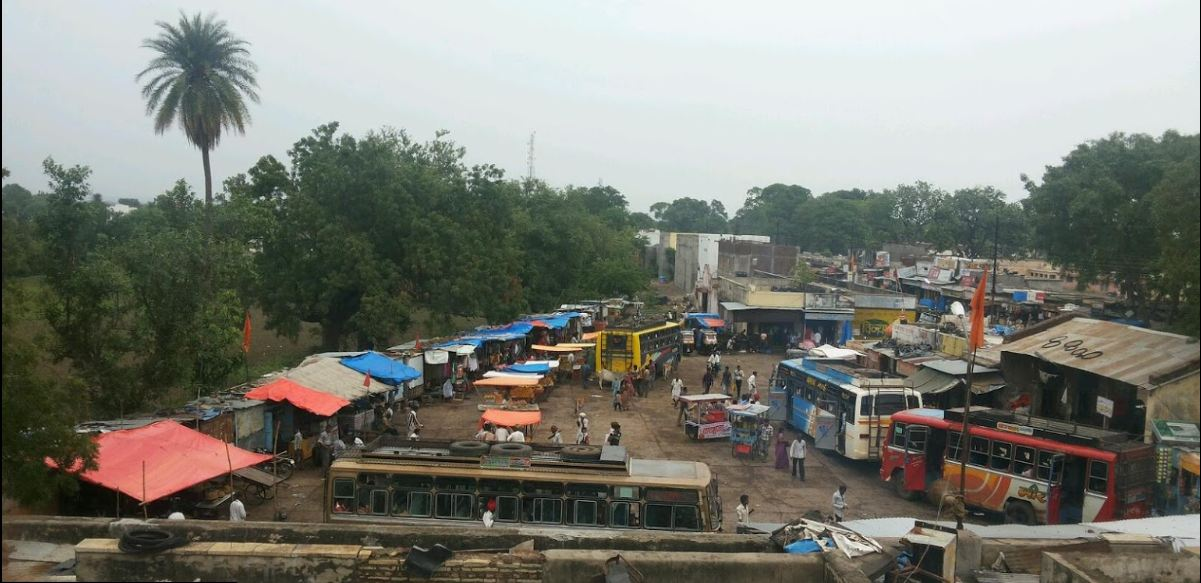
Bus station at Manasa

Major routes of buses from Manasa:

- Manasa - Kukdeshwar - Rampura - Ghandhi Sagar (Chambal) - Rawatbhata - Kota - Bundi
- Manasa - Kukdeshwar - Rampura - Ghandhi Sagar(Chambal) - Bhanpura - Kota
- Manasa - Piplia - Mandsaur - Ratlam-Ujjain
- Manasa - Sawankund - Savan - Girdauda - Neemuch
- Manasa - Dhakani - Kacholi

==== Bus stops ====
The town also has one proper bus station and two major bus stops.

=== Railways ===
The railway network is not currently established in Manasa. One can go to Neemuch or Piplia to get a train.

==== Nearest station ====
The nearest railway station is at Neemuch. (distance - 30 km)

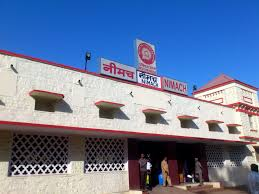
Railway station of Neemuch, front building

==== Other nearby stations ====
Note: red coloured: in Madhya Pradesh; white coloured: in Rajasthan

Station name	Distance from Manasa
Neemuch Railway Station	30 km
Piplia Railway Station	40 km
Nimbahera Railway Station	53.7 km
Mandsaur Railway Station	58 km
Chittaurgarh Railway Station	90.1 km
Jaora Railway Station	124 km
Kota Junction	172 km
Ratlam Junction	182 km

==== Helipad ====
Manasa has two helipads, one near Vivakanand Colony and another near Sawankund village.

==== Airport ====
The nearest airport is Maharana Pratap Airport or Dabok Airport at Udaipur (distance - 137 km).

==== Airstrip ====
An airstrip (हवाई पट्टी) also exists on the south of railway line near Jaisingpura village which is in Neemuch District. It is 31 km away from Manasa and the estimated time to reach there is 43 minutes.

== Demographics ==
As of the 2011 Census of India, Manasa had a population of 26,822. Males constitute 51% of the population and females 49%. Manasa has an average literacy rate of 68%, higher than the national average of 59.5%: male literacy is 77%, and female literacy is 58%. In Manasa, 14% of the population is under 6 years of age.

=== Festivals ===
All national festivals such as Teej, RangTeras, Raksha Bandhan, Krishna Janmashtami, Navratri, Durga puja, Dussehra, Ganesh Utsav, Deepavali, Ramzan, Gudi Padwa, Bhaidooj and others like Nagpanchmi are celebrated here.

== Areas ==
Manasa, being a developing town, is slowly emerging and expanding its areas.

=== Localities ===
- Court Area covers the area near the Local Judiciary Court of Manasa.
- Purana Manasa was the first civilization in Manasa. The town started its expansions from here. Long ago, it was the only part where people lived.
- Bada Bagela was named after a big Bohra mosque, Bohra Mazjid, which exists slightly in the center of this area. Bada Bagela consists of four streets of Manasa and seven other narrow streets known as Galis are in it.
- Ghandhi Chock was named after a famous little stage in Manasa known as Ghandhi Chock. The area starts right from the stage and ends at the historic temple of Badrivishal. The area does have a large territory road in it known as Sadar Bazar Road.
- Junasath is probably the longest spread out area as it covers the region over a long road known as Junasath Marg. It is a famous Momidian area which contains many tailoring stores.
- Usha Ganj Colony is one of the cleanest & lavish area in Manasa. A big garden is also situated in its center. The colony is well sanitized and clean. The roads are wide and provide ease to every resident.
- Maheshvaram Vihar Colony
- Gayatri Nagar A spiritual colony where situated a Temple called Gayatri Shakti Peeth.
- Govind Colony
- Ambedkar Colony
- Akshat Nagar
- Ma Vihar Colony
- Vivekanand Colony
- Anand Vihar Colony
- Noori Colony
- Wonder City
- Ishawar Nagar

=== Mohollas ===
- Ghati Moholla is covered on the topmost surface area of Manasa and hence was named as Ghati which means High surface or slanting areas.
- Dhobhi Moholla is famous for a number of cloth washers who have their business and houses there. It was named after Dhobhi as it means "washerman".

=== Commercial areas ===
- Kapda Bazar - A clothing market is present in Manasa. The cloth market is concentrated in a long narrow street, known as the Kapda Bazaar Road. With a number or clothing stores, some jewelry stores are also found there.
- Sadar Bazar - This is a combination of a steady market as well as houses of middle-class families. The market starts right from the great temple of Shri Badrivishal and extends well up to the memorable monument – "Vijay Sthamba." The road here is wide and provides almost everything that a person needs in day-to-day life. Things that can be found here are medical stores, clothing stores, groceries, electronics and electricals, stationery products, fast food and sweets, seeds and fertilizers, chilies and species, paan vendors, fruits and vegetables.
- Chopadgatta - numerous sweets shops have enjoyed business in Manasa at Chopadgataa which is referred to as "the heart of town" where one finds food items to enjoy after dinner, like gajak, gulab jamoon, rabri, and hot boiled milk.
- The Bus Stand Market is situated on the wide Bus Stand Road which is a major road of the town. It is a large commercial place where stores and shops of different products can be found. Sweets, clothes, shoes, electronics and groceries can be found in this market. The location of the bus station of Manasa here provides this area a good economy and transportation.
