= Ratangarh, Neemuch =

Ratangarh
- Town
- Location in Madhya Pradesh, India Ratangarh (India)
- Coordinates: 24.82°N 75.12°E
- Country: India
- State: Madhya Pradesh
- District: Neemuch

Area
  - Total: 18.78 km^{2} (7.25 sq mi)
- Elevation: 379 m (1,243 ft)

Population (2021)
  - Total: 10,900
  - Density: 580/km^{2} (1,500/sq mi)

Languages
  - Official: Hindi
- Time zone: UTC+5:30 (IST)
- Postal code: 458226
- Vehicle registration: MP-44
- Website: www.nagarparishadratangarh.com.in

Ratangarh is a town and a nagar parishad in Neemuch district in the Indian state of Madhya Pradesh.

== Geography ==
Ratangarh is located at 24.82°N 75.12°E. It has an average elevation of 379 metres (1243 feet).

== Demographics ==
As of 2001 India census, Ratangarh had a population of 7004. Males constitute 51% of the population and females 49%. Ratangarh has an average literacy rate of 65%, higher than the national average of 59.5%: male literacy is 75%, and female literacy is 55%. In Ratangarh, 15% of the population is under 6 years of age.
