= Water Resources Department, Madhya Pradesh =

The Water Resources Department is the government department in the state of Madhya Pradesh responsible for irrigation and flood control.
