= Diken =

Dikken
- Town
- Location in Madhya Pradesh, India Dikken (India)
- Coordinates: 24°40′28″N 75°0′34″E
- Country: India
- State: Madhya Pradesh
- District: Neemuch

Population (2001)
  - Total: 7,206

Languages
  - Official: Hindi
- Time zone: UTC+5:30 (IST)
- ISO 3166 code: IN-MP
- Vehicle registration: MP

Diken is a town and a nagar panchayat in Neemuch district in the state of Madhya Pradesh, India.

== Demographics ==
As of 2001 India census, Diken had a population of 7,206. Males constitute 51% of the population and females 49%. Diken has an average literacy rate of 57%, lower than the national average of 59.5%: male literacy is 72% and, female literacy is 40%. In Diken, 15% of the population is under 6 years of age.

== Specialty ==
Diken has a large solar panel plant area, which is the largest in Madhya Pradesh.

== Transport ==
The nearest airports are Indore Airport and Maharana Pratap Airport in Udaipur, Rajasthan.
