= Ghanshyam Patidar =

Indian politician (died 2019)

Ghanshyam Patidar (died 2 February 2019) was a former minister in the government of Madhya Pradesh in India from 1998 to 2003, and an MLA from the Jawad Constituency.
