= Haribhau Joshi =

Indian politician

Haribhau Joshi (died 17 December 2009) was a leader of Bharatiya Janata Party. He was Education minister in Government of Madhya Pradesh. He represented Susner assembly constituency in the Madhya Pradesh Legislative Assembly. He died in 2009. He was a well Known poet. His poetry writings can be found in his book "Jijivisha".
