= Jawad, Madhya Pradesh =

Jawad
- town
- Location in Madhya Pradesh, India Jawad (India)
- Coordinates: 24.6°N 74.85°E
- Country: India
- State: Madhya Pradesh
- District: Neemuch
- Elevation: 452 m (1,483 ft)

Population (2011)
  - Total: 17,129

Languages
  - Official: Hindi
- Time zone: UTC+5:30 (IST)
- PIN: 458330
- Telephone code: 07420
- Vehicle registration: MP 44
- Website: www.neemuch.nic.in

Jawad is a Tehsil and a Nagar Panchayat in Neemuch district in the Indian state of Madhya Pradesh.

== Geography ==
Jawad is located on 24.60°N 74.85°E. It has an average elevation of 439 metres (1440 feet). It comes under the Malwa Region on the Malwa Plateau.

== Demographics ==
As of the 2011 Census of India, Jawad had a population of 17,129. Males constitute 51% of the population and females 49%. Jawad has an average literacy rate of 70%, higher than the national average of 59.5%: male literacy is 80%, and female literacy is 59%. In Jawad, 11.5% of the population is under 6 years of age.

== Administration ==
Jawad is a tehsil headquarter, There are six towns and 134 villages in Jawad. Jawad is a Nagar Parishad and Divided into 15 ward. Every 5 year local elections operate in town.

== People from Jawad ==
- Virendra Kumar Saklecha
- Satyanarayan Jatiya
- Om Prakash Sakhlecha

== Transportation ==
Jawad is located 15 km away from Neemach, 45 km away from Manasa, 70 km away from Mandsaur and 60 km away from Chittorgarh. Major road connects it's from Nearby Cities. Daily bus service available here.
