= Neemuch =

Neemuch Nimach
- City
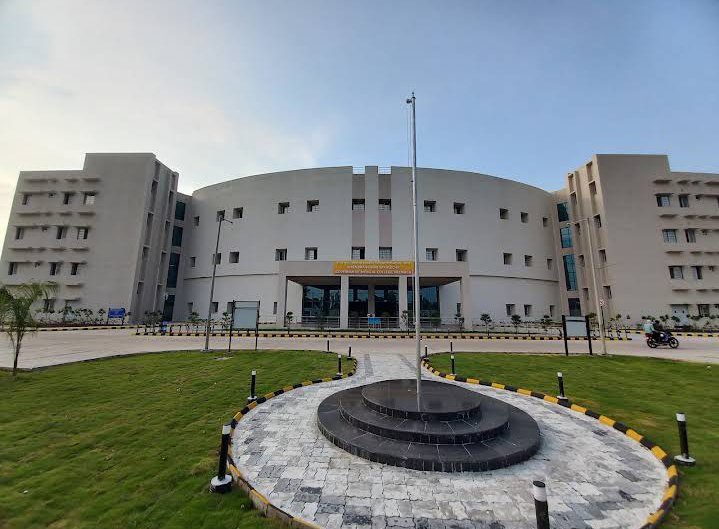
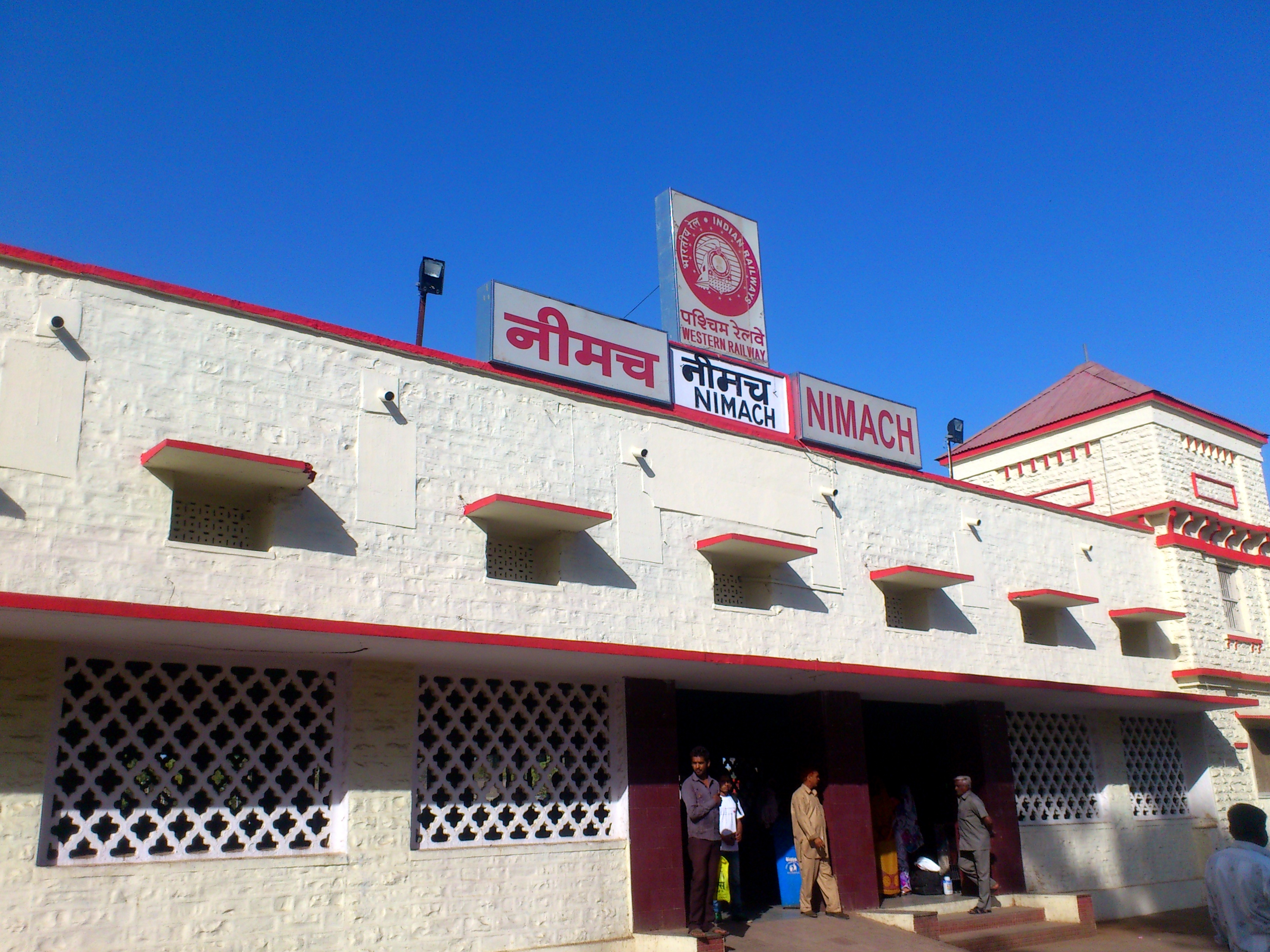
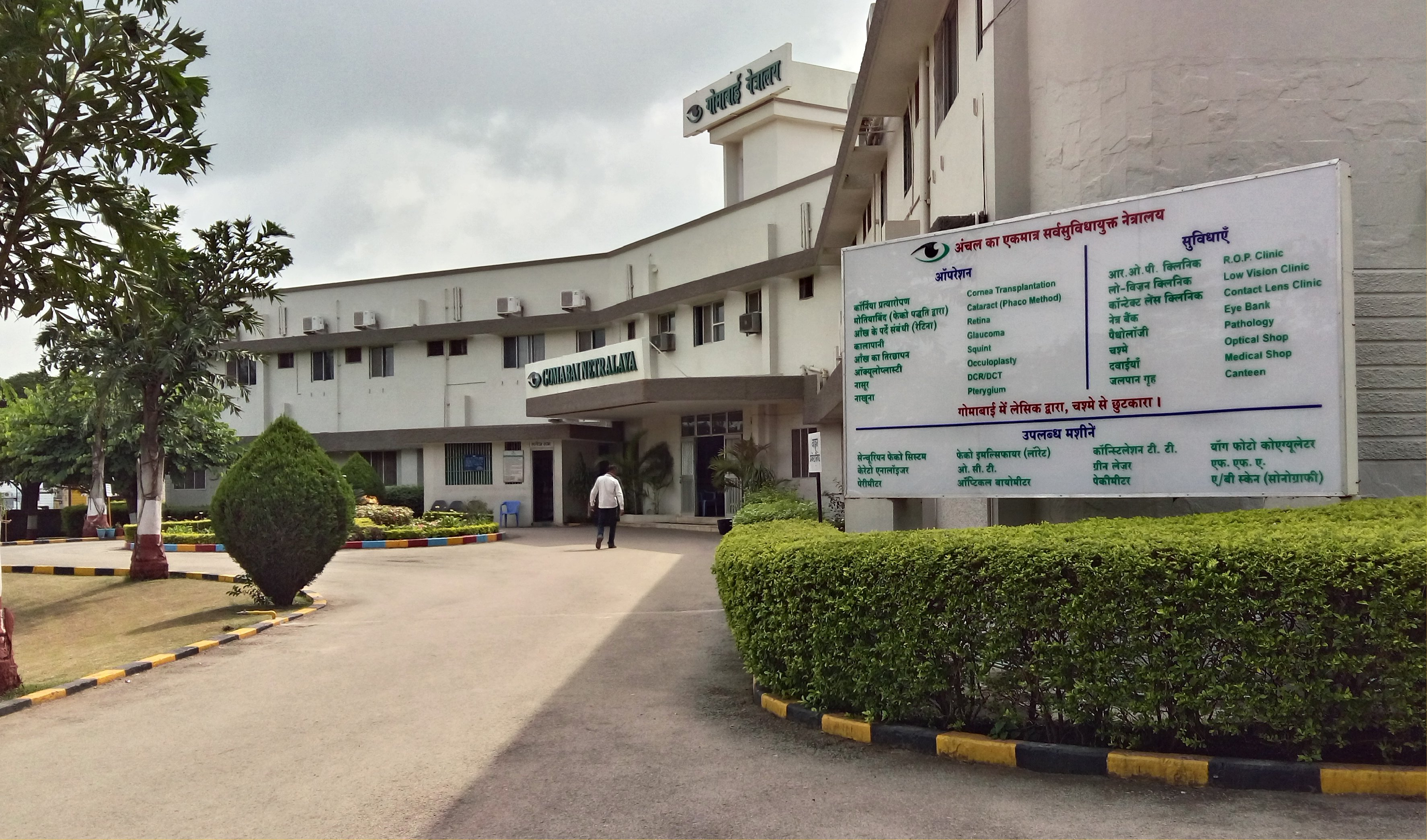
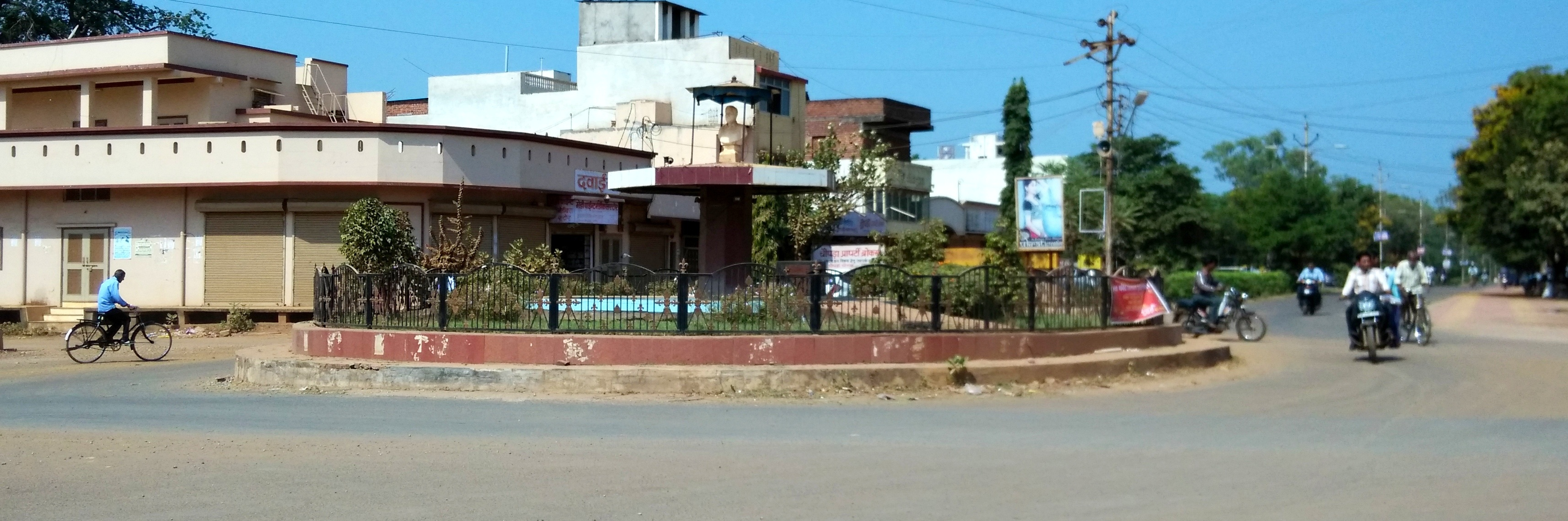
- Neemuch City MP

- Location in Madhya Pradesh, India
- Coordinates: 24°27′42.746″N 74°52′19.261″E
- Country: India
- State: Madhya Pradesh
- District: Neemuch

Government
  - Body: Nagar Palika Parishad

Area
  - Total: 40 km^{2} (15 sq mi)
- Elevation: 452 m (1,483 ft)

Population (2011)
  - Total: 128,561
  - Density: 170/km^{2} (440/sq mi)

Languages
  - Official: Hindi and Malvi
- Time zone: UTC+5:30 (IST)
- PIN: 458441
- Telephone code: 07423
- Vehicle registration: MP-44
- Literacy: 71.81 per cent
- Sex ratio: 959
- Website: neemuch.nic.in

Neemuch or Nimach is a city in the Malwa region of Madhya Pradesh. The town shares its northwestern border with the state of Rajasthan and is the administrative headquarters of Neemuch District. Formerly a large British cantonment of Gwalior princely state, in 1822 the town became the headquarters of the combined Rajputana–Malwa political agency and of the Malwa Agency in 1895. The British Cantonment was disbanded in 1932 after which it was maintained by a British Municipal Board.

== History ==
The city was the location of a palace in the district of the Ajmer. Originally a part of the territory of Malwa, it was given to the Rana in 1768 to pay off debts incurred by the Rana (king) of Mewar. After that, it became a British cantonment of the Gwalior princely state, except for short periods in 1794 and 1844 and 1965. The cantonment area of Neemuch was a planned town constructed by the British in 1817 as a local military headquarters for the region. The Neemuch cantonment played a significant role in the Indian Rebellion of 1857 and was the centre of disturbances in Malwa. After the end of rebellion and transfer of power directly to the British crown in the Raj, Neemuch has always climbed the stairs of progress and success.

In 1857, Neemuch was the most southerly place to which the rebellion extended. A brigade of native Bengal troops were stationed at Neemuch, then mutinied and marched Delhi. European officers took refuge in the fort, and were later besieged by a rebel force from Mandsaur. The Europeans defended the city until relieved by the Malwa field force. Since 1895, Neemuch had been the headquarters of the political agent in Malwa, a subdivision of the British Central India Agency.

Neemuch was also the station for the following Indian Army Regiments:

- Bombay Army - 2nd Bombay Light Cavalry
- Bombay Army - 3rd Bombay Light Cavalry (Lancers)
- Bombay Army - 23rd Bombay Native Light Infantry
- Bengal Army - 37th Regiment of Bengal Native Infantry
- Bengal Army - 49th Regiment of Bengal Native Infantry
- Bengal Army - 72nd Regiment of Bengal Native Infantry

Neemuch was also the station of the 26th and 48th field artillery batteries of the British in India.

== Geography ==
Neemuch district is part of the Ujjain Division. It borders Rajasthan to the west and north and Mandsaur district to the east and south. It was split from Mandsaur District on 30 June 1998.

The city is divided into three main parts: Neemuch city, Cantt (or Chhavani), and Baghana.

The Neemuch district has approximately 956,000 inhabitants as of 2001.

== Demographics ==
As of the 2011 Census of India, Neemuch had a population of 127,000. Males constitute 53% of the population and females 47%. Neemuch has an average literacy rate of 85%, higher than the national average of 59.5%: male literacy is 77%, and female literacy is 62%. In Neemuch, 14% of the population is under 6 years of age.

According to 2011 census 70.31% of the population of Neemuch District is in rural areas while 29.69% is in urban areas.

Neemuch District has fourth lowest rural growth rate of 11% in Madhya Pradesh, while state average is 18.4%, highest being 31.7% of Jhabua.

Religion in Neemuch
Religion	Percent
Hindus	85%
Muslims	11%
Jains	2.5%
Others†	1%
Christians	0.5%
Distribution of religions †Includes Sikhs (1%), Buddhists (<0.5%).

Population changes
Year	1901	1911	1921	1931	1941	1951	1981	1991	2001	2011
Population	6,190	4,989	3,973	4,304	5,111	6,413	65,800	86,439	112,852	128,561

== Physiography ==
Neemuch district comes under the agro-climatic zone Malwa Plateau, lies between the parallels of latitude 24°15’ – 24°35’ north, and between the meridians of longitude 74°45’ - 75°37’ east spread over an area of 3,875 square kilometres. It has surrounding of Kota, Jhalawar, Chittaurgarh and Pratapgarh District of Rajasthan State while Mandsaur District of Madhya Pradesh.

== Climate ==
Due to the location of Neemuch in the Malwa region. the climate is pleasant. The highest maximum temperature of 46° is reached in May and June and remains up to last week of June. In winters, the minimum temperature reaches 2 °C in the months of December and January. The average rainfall of Neemuch is 812 mm and maximum rainfall occurs in month of July and August. The lowest rainfall of 501.6 mm was recorded in 2007 where as maximum rainfall of 1352 mm occurred in 2006. The reason for drop in rainfall in 2007 was due to the drought conditions in the district. Wind direction is from south—west to north in April to September months and in the remaining months of the year it is north—east direction to south-west direction. Wind speed is low in two months of the year.

Climate data for Neemuch (1981–2010, extremes 1901–2008)
Month	Jan	Feb	Mar	Apr	May	Jun	Jul	Aug	Sep	Oct	Nov	Dec	Year
Record high °C (°F)	32.8 (91.0)	36.8 (98.2)	41.8 (107.2)	44.6 (112.3)	46.7 (116.1)	46.1 (115.0)	42.2 (108.0)	38.2 (100.8)	39.8 (103.6)	39.4 (102.9)	36.0 (96.8)	32.8 (91.0)	46.7 (116.1)
Mean daily maximum °C (°F)	25.0 (77.0)	27.8 (82.0)	33.1 (91.6)	38.0 (100.4)	40.1 (104.2)	37.3 (99.1)	31.8 (89.2)	29.9 (85.8)	32.0 (89.6)	33.9 (93.0)	30.3 (86.5)	26.7 (80.1)	32.2 (90.0)
Mean daily minimum °C (°F)	9.7 (49.5)	12.1 (53.8)	17.1 (62.8)	22.0 (71.6)	25.0 (77.0)	24.9 (76.8)	23.0 (73.4)	22.4 (72.3)	21.6 (70.9)	19.0 (66.2)	14.6 (58.3)	10.7 (51.3)	18.5 (65.3)
Record low °C (°F)	−1.1 (30.0)	−0.6 (30.9)	4.4 (39.9)	8.9 (48.0)	13.8 (56.8)	15.2 (59.4)	13.3 (55.9)	9.2 (48.6)	15.2 (59.4)	10.6 (51.1)	5.0 (41.0)	0.6 (33.1)	−1.1 (30.0)
Average rainfall mm (inches)	2.0 (0.08)	1.0 (0.04)	0.9 (0.04)	1.6 (0.06)	5.4 (0.21)	66.9 (2.63)	202.0 (7.95)	281.0 (11.06)	90.9 (3.58)	16.0 (0.63)	4.1 (0.16)	0.8 (0.03)	672.6 (26.48)
Average rainy days	0.2	0.2	0.1	0.2	0.7	3.8	8.5	10.7	5.0	1.0	0.4	0.1	30.9
Average relative humidity (%) (at 17:30 IST)	40	32	25	22	26	43	68	76	65	40	38	38	43
Source: India Meteorological Department

== Soil ==
The soils in the district are generally of four types viz., medium deep black cotton soil, red loamy soil, laterite soil and alluvial soil. Black cotton soil is derived from weathering and disintegration of basaltic lava flow. Major parts of the district are covered by medium deep black soil. Red loamy soils consist of sandy loam to clay loam and brick in colour. This soil is derived from Vindhyan sandstone and shale and occurring in valley portion on the plateau and adjacent to hill composed of Vindhyan sandstone. This type of soil covers a Northern part of the district. Laterite soil dark brown to pink coloured lateritic soil is found as capping over hillocks of basaltic terrain. Alluvial soils are greyish yellow to brownish yellow in colour and occupy along the major rivers.

== Economy ==
Neemuch was the birthplace of the Central Reserve Police Force (CRPF) in 1939 and is home to a large scale army recruitment centre for the organisation. The CRPF still maintains part of Neemuch's British Military Cantonment, which was the first of its kind in India. The bungalow area, native troops area, bazaar, fields and gardens were maintained initially by the municipal board and later by the Municipal Council. After independence Neemuch and the Baghana area were included in the municipal area. Neemuch is known as India's eye donation capital as with the highest per capita eye donation rate in the country. Neemuch also has Asia's largest opium alkaloid processing plant which is a government-owned company named- Opium and Alkaloid Works.

The economy of Neemuch is mainly based on the agriculture produce market (called Krishi Upaj Mandi in Hindi) which is Asia's largest agriculture produce market yard and the world's second largest as per 2011 report by MCX and WTO in terms of the agricultural products arrival. Many types of cereals, pulses, spices, oil seeds and herbs are traded in the agriculture market of Neemuch.

Cereals include wheat, barley, maize or corn, jowar. Spices such as coriander, fenugreek, ajwain, poppy seeds or posta, jeera, black cumin or kalongi, halim seeds, suwa, and tukmaria. Pulses are gram (chickpea), urad, moong, masoor, peas. Oil seeds such as soybean, black mustard, yellow mustard, flax seeds, groundnut, sesame seeds, taramira seeds, castor seeds, dolmi and other products such as garlic, onion, guar seeds, and isabgol seeds.

Neemuch is a prominent trading centre of herbs in India and is the only auction and trading centre of ashwagandha roots (Indian ginseng, withania somnifera) in the world.

Major exportable items are isabgol, ashwagandha and many kind of herbs, methi, ajwain, coriander, soybean products like oil, de-oiled cake, soybean, paneer (cheese), soya papar, soy milk, garlic powder, onion powder, dehydrated flakes of onion and garlic, red chili powder, leather garments, and artificial jewelry.

== Milestones ==
=== Welspun Solar MP project ===
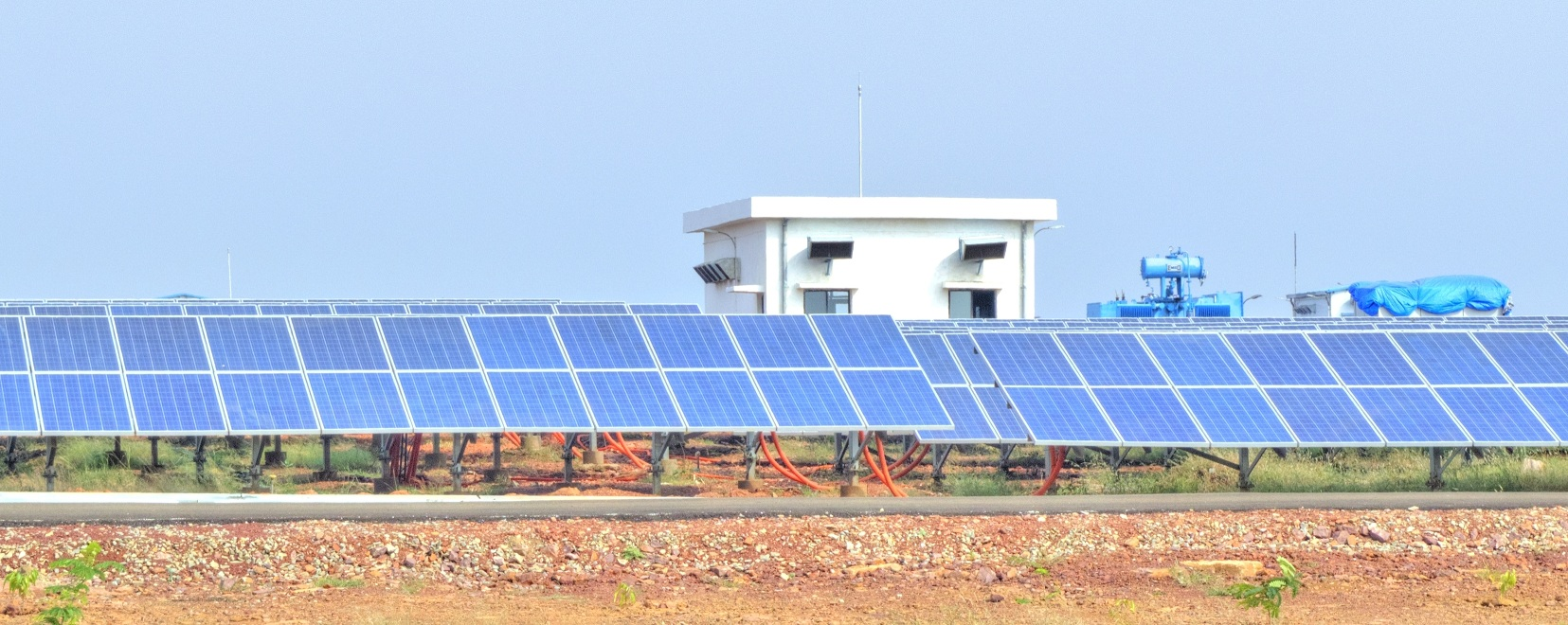
Welspun Solar MP project, Bhagwanpura, Diken

Welspun Solar MP project is one of the largest solar power plant in Asia, inaugurated by Narendra Modi, as BJP's prime ministerial candidate. It is a 151 megawatt photo-voltaic power station constructed at a cost of 1,100 crore rupees (about $182,000,000) on 305 hectares (750 acres) of land operating since February 2014 at Neemuch.

Neemuch also has one of the only 51 automatic solar resource monitoring stations (ASRMS) in India. The implementation started in February 2011 and it was commissioned on 30 September 2011. It is to assess and quantify the solar radiation availability, along with weather parameters, with a view to develop a solar atlas. Report of Solar Radiation Resource Assessment (SRRA) Station at Neemuch can be found online. It indicates monthly values of solar radiation and meteorological parameters.

=== Gomabai Netralaya ===
An ophthalmic centre that under the leadership of G.D. Agrawal and the help of Ramji Lal Goyal, Gomabai Netralaya was established at Neemuch in 1992. Within a span of a decade, it has become one of the leading ophthalmic centres in India. Neemuch, though situated in Madhya Pradesh, is located close to Rajasthan and Gujarat. Therefore, tribal and rural poor from these states constitute 70% of patients. Gomabai Netralaya has played a key role in achieving the highest per capita rate of eye donation in India for Neemuch and the facilities provided by the institute for performing penetrating keratoplasty, can provide a complete solution to the problem of corneal blindness in the region. Gomabai Netralaya is also involved in a continuous process of educating staff and conducting research into the cause and cure of blinding eye diseases.

== Tourism and places of interest ==
=== Sukhanandji Ashram ===
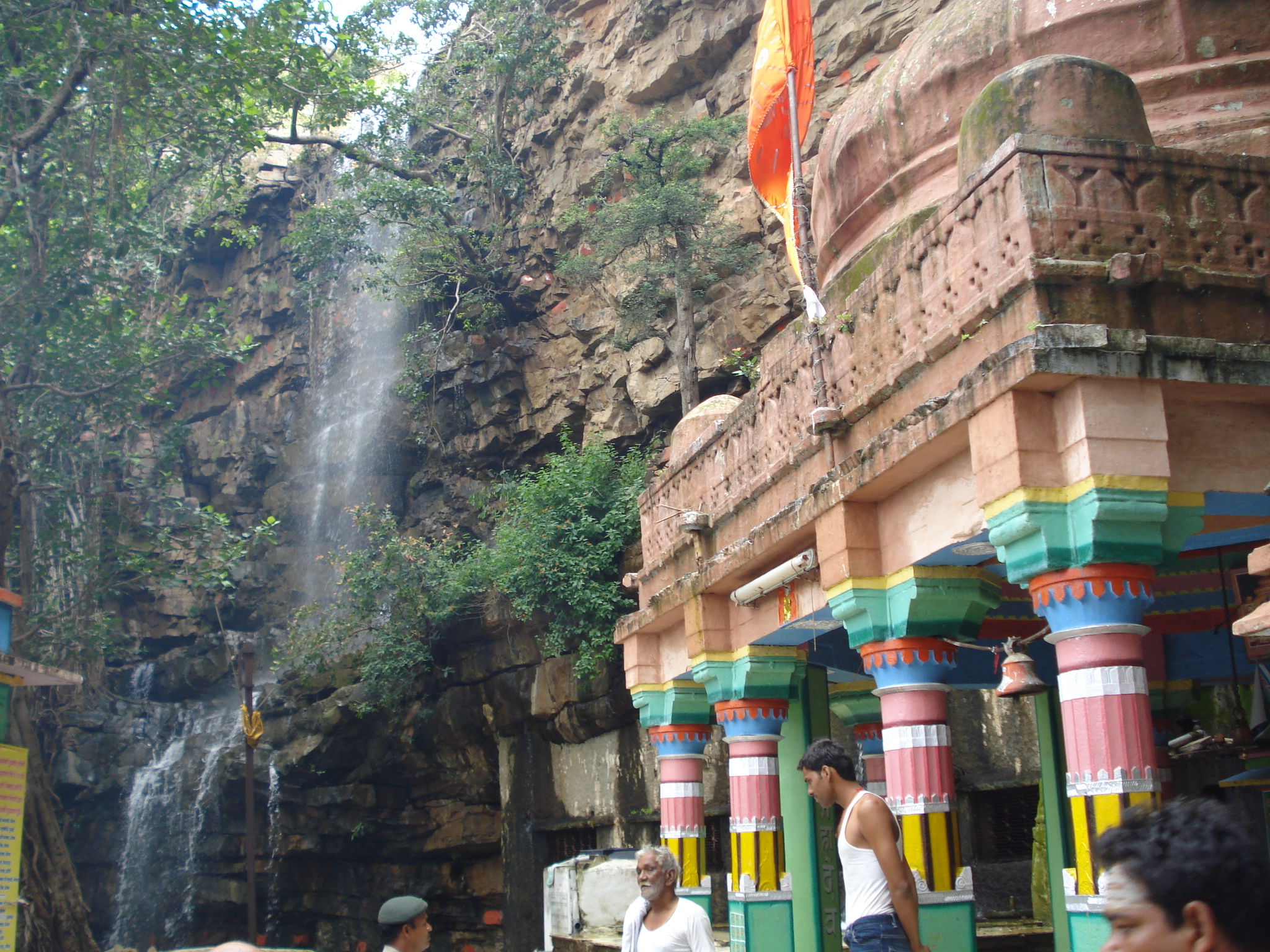
Sukhanand Ashram

Sukhanandji Ashram or Sukhanand Dham is situated at a distance of about 32 km from Nimach on the border of Rajasthan in an ancient rock cave. There is a temple of Shiva here. There is a spring of perennial water. It is said to be founded by Śuka, the son of Vedavyasa. A character in a number of Puranic texts belonging to various traditions, mainly Vaishnavism. He is believed to be a son of Vyasadeva. It also believed that Vedavyasa first wrote Bharata-Samhita which contained twenty-four thousand verses (slokas) and taught that to his son Śuka.

There are two annual fairs organized at this place: one on Haryali amavashya of Srawan month and other on Baisakh purnima.

=== Nava Toran temple ===
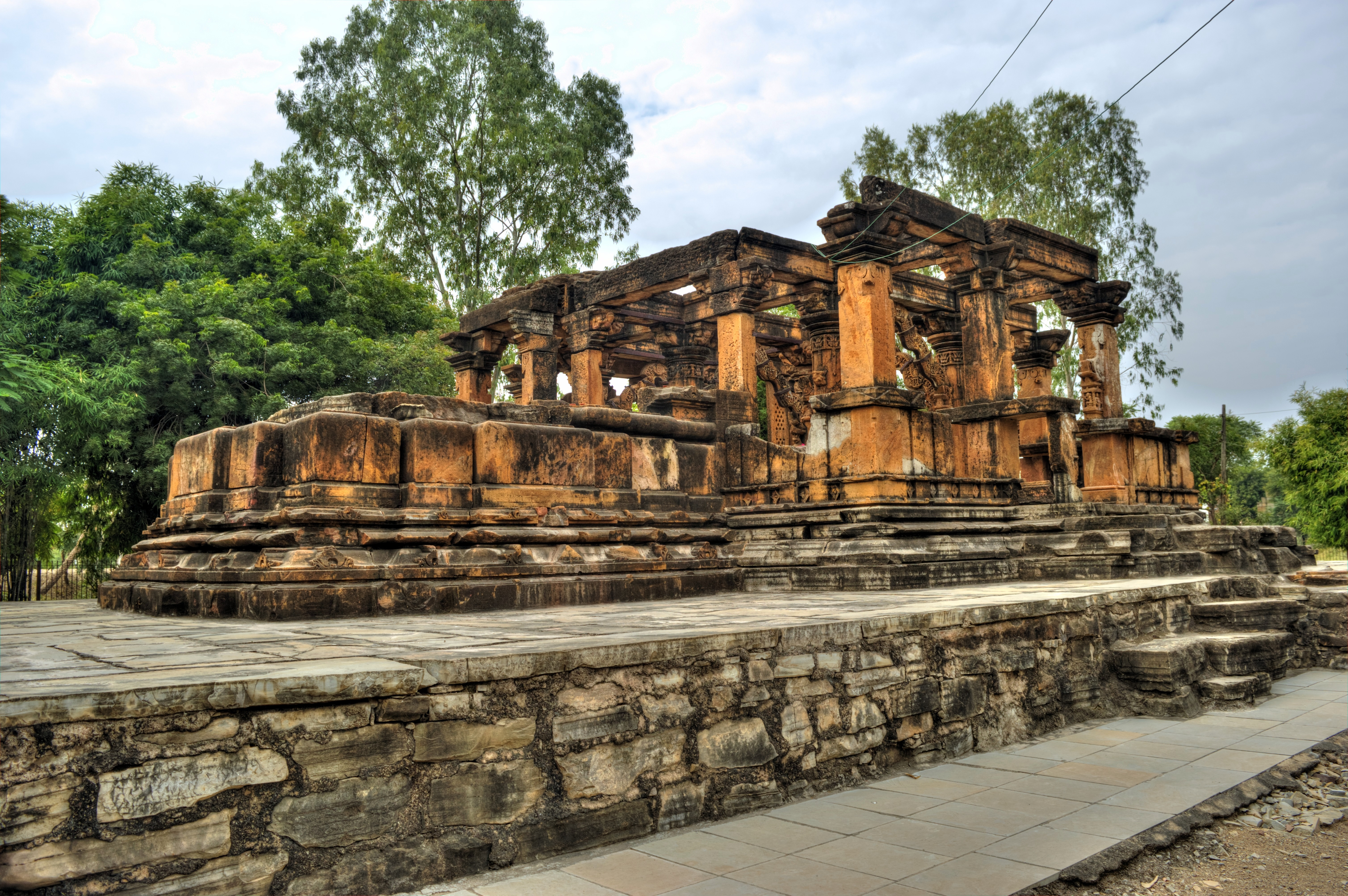
Nova Toran Temple, Khor

Nava Toran temple or Nav Toran Temple at village Khor is in a ruined condition. It contains a proch, mahamandapa and garbhagriha and pradakshinapth. It has a Siva linga in the sanctum. The exterior is ornamented with simple mouldings (c.12th century). This monument has been declared to be of national importance under the Ancient Monuments and Archaeological Sites and Remains Act, 1958 (24 of 1958).

=== Gandhi Sagar Sanctuary ===
Gandhi Sagar Sanctuary is a wildlife sanctuary situated on the northern boundary of Mandsaur and Neemuch districts in Madhya Pradesh. It is spread over an area of 368.62 km square adjoining Rajasthan state in India. It was notified in 1974 and more area was added in 1983. The Chambal River passes through the sanctuary and divides into two parts. The western part is in Neemuch district and eastern part is in Mandsaur district.

=== Morwan Dam ===
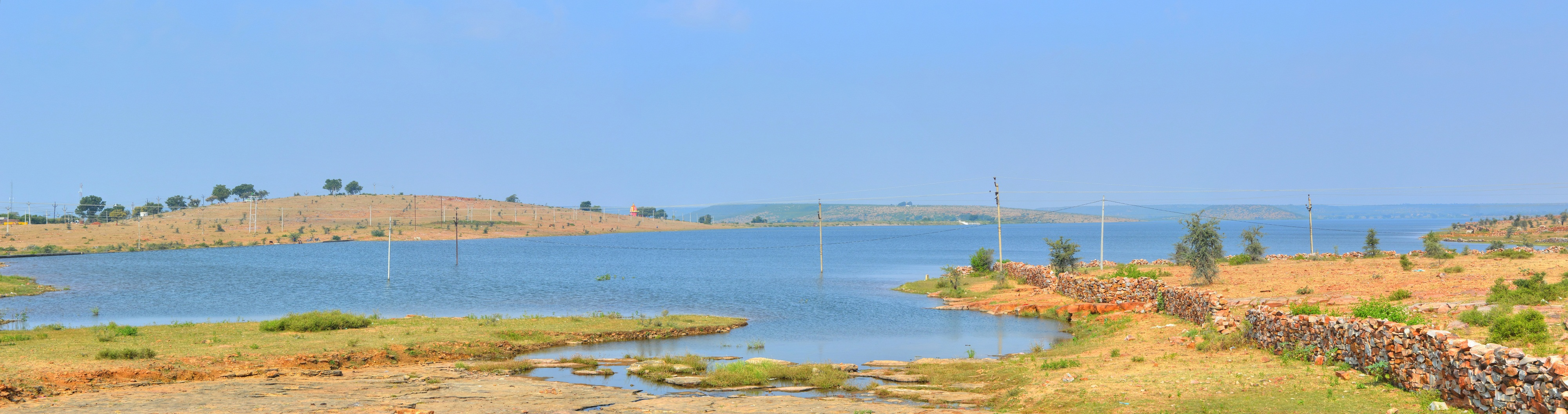
Morwan Dam

Morwan Dam is 24 km from Neemuch and constructed on river Gambhiri. It is mainly used for irrigation and water supply to nearby places. Boating facilities are also available. Frequent buses are available to reach there (Neemuch-Singoli-Kota Road).

== Social infrastructure ==
There are two PG: colleges, one for law and another for arts. There are 196 primary schools, six senior secondary schools, 15 secondary schools and 42 middle schools in Neemuch city as per 2001 census figures. Besides these, there are 20 middle schools and 30 primary schools run by private institutions. There are two stadiums and one swimming pool in the city. There are 30 parks and gardens, one Dussehra Maidan, 22 auditoriums and four public libraries exist in the city. There are six kabristans and four cremation grounds.

In October 2024, a Government Medical College was inaugurated in Neemuch by the incumbent chief minister of Madhya Pradesh Dr. Mohan Yadav built by the Government of Madhya Pradesh, for the people of Neemuch District to improve the health infrastructure of the city. It is named after Virendra Kumar Sakhlecha, the former chief minister of Madhya Pradesh hailing from Neemuch district.

=== Minerals ===
Production of minerals 2010-11:

Mineral	Production (2010–2011)
Major minerals	
Limestone	5,953,103 M.T.
Laterite	310,334 M.T.
Minor minerals	
Stone/gitti	49,697 m^{3}
Murum	80,545 m^{3}
Clay	8559 m^{3}
Sand	19,420 m^{3}

=== Sports ===
Neemuch has a rich sporting history, especially in soccer. Despite being a small town, Neemuch has produced a number of players who have played in the Indian soccer league. Neemuch has about 12 local soccer clubs which participate in the tournament organized by local municipal council every year. Cricket is also a very popular sport.

In Madhya Pradesh also football is second-largest sport. Over 9,000 players play from over 1,500 clubs across the state. There are as many as 70 all-India and 100 state-level tournaments each year.

Football teams are the Central Reserve Police (Neemuch) and Neemuch XI.

Neemuch's Olympic size swimming pool, known as Padm Taran Pushkar, was inaugurated in 1978. It has 1-metre and 3-metre springboards, and 5-metre and 10-metre-high (33 ft) diving platforms.

== Transportation ==
=== Rail ===
Neemuch is an important broad gauge railway station of the Ajmer — Ratlam route. Neemuch railway station was constructed by the British in 1880. It has direct links to Ratlam, Ujjain via Nagda and Kota and Bundi in Rajasthan via Chittorgarh. It is about 140 km from Ratlam and 60 km from Chittorgarh by rail and road.

A demand for a separate rail line from Neemuch via Jawad, Singoli (Tehsil headquarters) to Kota has been raised by its people and representatives that will reduce the distance between Neemuch and Kota by about 40 km and a survey was also passed by former Rail Minister Mallikarjun Kharge in his interim rail budget in 2014.

=== Road ===
Neemuch has a network of district roads and National Highway 79 connecting with other cities of this district, Madhya Pradesh state and neighbouring Rajasthan state. NH 79 links it to Ajmer, Chittor and Ratlam of MP. The state highway connects the city with Udaipur in Rajasthan via Chhoti Sadri. Except for the national highway, district roads going to Singoli and Manasa are maintained by state PWD where as the city roads are maintained by the municipal council.

The roads within the CRPF area are maintained by the central government. This city has one bus stand.

=== Air ===
An airstrip also exists on the south of the railway line near Jaisinghpura village. The operating agency is the Indian Air Force.

24° 25' 51N 74° 52' 4E	Runway 32/14 3610/95 GRE	Elevation: 1600 AMSL	Magnetic variation: 0.005 W	IATA code FR 3231	ICAO (FAA VA1N)

An air taxi service has been introduced by Madhya Pradesh Tourism (with Ventura AirConnect) which provides air connectivity with Neemuch on requirement.

== Media ==
=== Radio ===
Neemuch has only one FM radio channel, All India Radio, at 100.1 MHz. It is a low-power transmitter relay of 100 W.

=== Newspaper ===
Apart from major newspaper publishing houses, various regional publishers are also dominant in the city, namely "Hindi Khabarwaala Web & App News (हिंदी ख़बरवाला वेब न्यूज़ चैनल)", "Voice of MP Android News App" Neemcuch Mandi Bhav Website "mkisan","Nai Vidha", Dashpur Express, Malwa Today, Malwa Darshan, and Neemuch Patrika. Dominant state newspaper publishing houses are Nai duniya Dainik Bhaskar, Raj Express and Hindi Gyani.

=== Books, novels, and poems ===
- The Conceited Sparrow of Neemuch: A Conceit in Four Flights of Fancy (1880)
- Neemuch is mentioned in the poem "The Seven Seas/The Ladies" by Rudyard Kipling who is a British author and poet, born in Bombay.
- Narrative of a Journey Through the Upper Provinces of India, Volume 2 by Reginald Heber
- Studies In Indian History: Rajasthan Through the Ages the Heritage of Rajputs (set of 5 volumes)

== Notable people ==
- Umashanker Muljibhai Trivedi, Member of Parliament
- V. S. Wakankar, archeologist
- Virendra Kumar Sakhlecha, Chief Minister of Madhya Pradesh, 1978–1980
- Sunderlal Patwa, Chief Minister of Madhya Pradesh, 1980 and 1990–1992.
- C. P. Gurnani, CEO of Tech Mahindra.
- Abidali Neemuchwala, businessman.
- James Edward Tierney Aitchison, Scottish surgeon and botanist.
