= Battle of Sondani =

528 battle

- Part of Gupta–Hunnic Wars
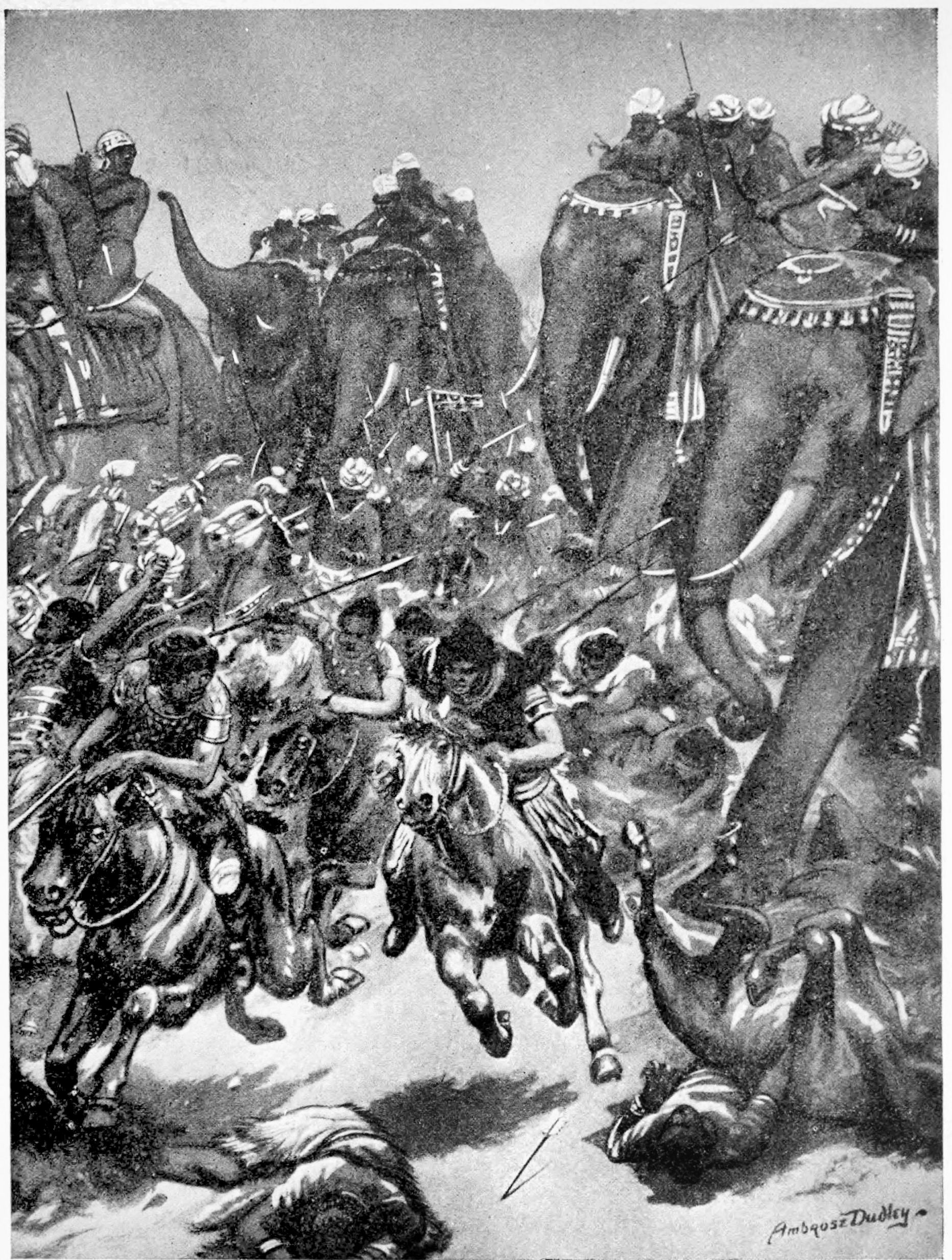
- The defeat of the Huna emperor Mihirakula by King Yashodharman at Sondani in 528 CE (early 20th century illustration).
Date	528 CE
Location	Sondani, Madhya Pradesh, India
Result	Second Aulikara victory; Final defeat and elimination of the Alchon Huns in India.; drove away the Huns out of India

Belligerents
Alchon Huns	Malwa; Gupta Empire

Commanders and leaders
Mihirakula (POW)	Yashodharman; Narsimhagupta

The Battle of Sondani was a large military encounter fought in 528 CE, between the Alchon Hun king Mihirakula and a confederation of Indian rulers led by King Yashodharman of Malwa (aka Second Aulikara Dynasty) and supported by King Narasimhagupta of the Gupta Empire.

== Background ==
The Alchon Huns under their able leader Toramana invaded the mainland of the Indian subcontinent. The Huns extensively weakened the Gupta Empire by their devastating raids. Toramana was finally vanquished with certainty by an Indian king of the Aulikaras of Malwa, after nearly 20 years in India. According to the Risthal stone-slab inscription, discovered in 1983, King Prakashadharma defeated Toramana in 515 CE. The First Hunnic War thus ended with a Hunnic defeat, and their troops apparently retreated to the area of Mahasaptsindhu

Mihirakula, the eldest son and successor of Toramana, again invaded India. He was even crueler and caused more destruction than his predecessor. Yashodharman, the ruler of Malwa and the son of King Prakashadharma, created an alliance with the other Indian rulers to defeat the Huns.

== Result ==
The Hunas were ultimately defeated by a coalition of Indian rulers that included an Indian king Yasodharman and the Gupta emperor, Narasimhagupta. They defeated a Huna army and their ruler Mihirakula in 528 CE and drove them out of India.

This resulted in the loss of Alchon possessions in the Punjab and north India by 542. The Sondani inscription in Sondani, near Mandsaur, records the submission by the Hunas, and claims that Yasodharman had rescued the earth from rude and cruel kings, (Note: "The earth betook itself (for succour), when it was afflicted by kings of the present age, who manifested pride; who were cruel through want of proper training; who, from delusion, transgressed the path of good conduct; (and) who were destitute of virtuous delights " from "Sondhni pillars: where Punjabis met with their Waterloo 1500 years ago". Punjab Monitor. Amritsar: Bhai Nand Lal Foundation. 27 April 2013.) and that he "had bent the head of Mihirakula". In a part of the Sondani inscription Yasodharman thus praises himself for having defeated king Mihirakula:

He (Yasodharman) to whose two feet respect was paid, with complimentary presents of the flowers from the lock of hair on the top of (his) head, by even that (famous) king Mihirakula, whose forehead was pained through being bent low down by the strength of (his) arm in (the act of compelling) obeisance

— Sondani pillar inscription

The Gupta King Narasimhagupta is also credited in helping repulse Mihirakula, after the latter had conquered most of India, according to the reports of Chinese monk Xuanzang.

In a fanciful account, Xuanzang, who wrote a century later in 630 CE, reported that Mihirakula had conquered all India except for an island where the King of Magadha named Baladitya (who could be Gupta ruler Narasimhagupta Baladitya) took refuge, but that was finally captured by the Indian king. He later spared Mihirakula's life on the intercession of his mother, as she perceived the Hun ruler "as a man of remarkable beauty and vast wisdom". Mihirakula is then said to have returned to Kashmir to retake the throne.

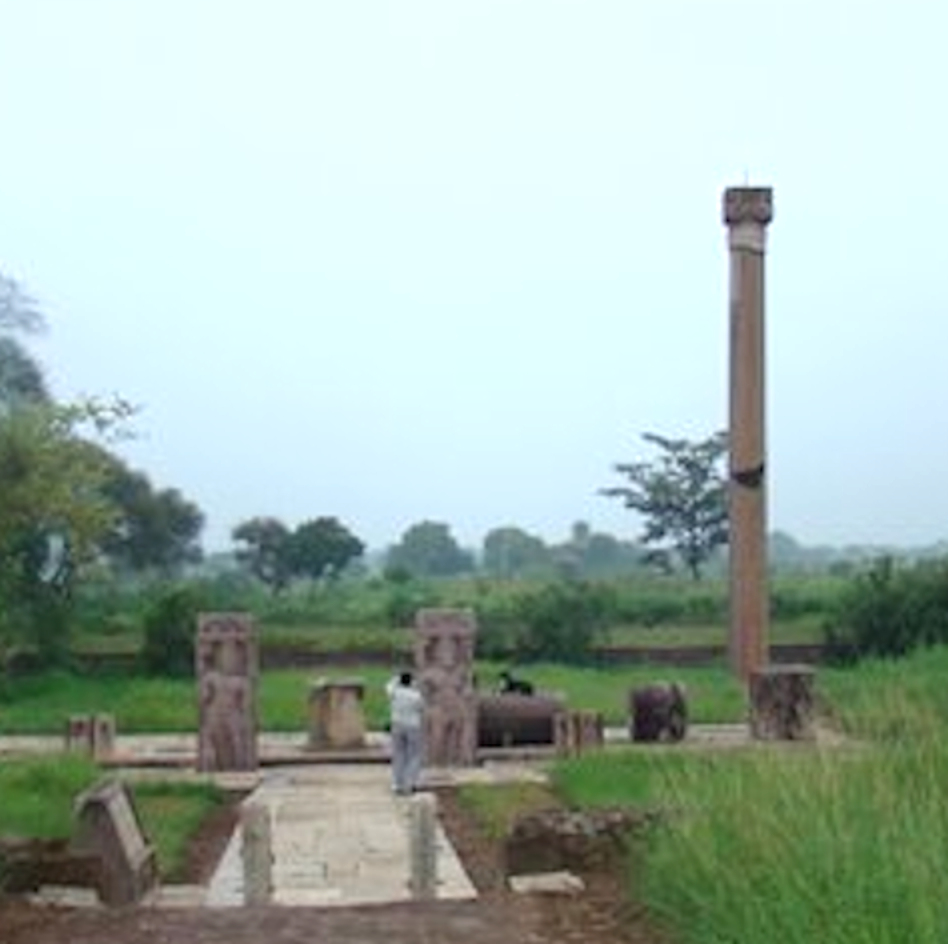
Victory pillar of Yashodharman at Sondani, Mandsaur.

== Aftermath ==
After the war was over, Yashodharman conquered vast territories and established a short-lived empire.

In the Mandsaur pillar inscription, Yashodharman claims he vanquished his enemies and now controls the territory from the neighbourhood of the (river) Lauhitya (Brahmaputra River) to the "Western Ocean" (Western Indian Ocean), and from the Himalayas to mountain Mahendra.

Yashodharman thus conquered vast territories from the Hunas and the Guptas, although his short-lived empire would ultimately disintegrated between c. 530-540 CE. The Guptas continued to rule in Magadha as mere rulers until around 720.

== See also ==
- First battle of Eran
- Second battle of Eran
