= Mandsaur Pillar inscriptions of Yashodharman =

Sanskrit inscriptions in Madhya Pradesh

Coordinates: 24.0413°N 75.0918°E

Mandasor Pillar inscription of Yasodharman
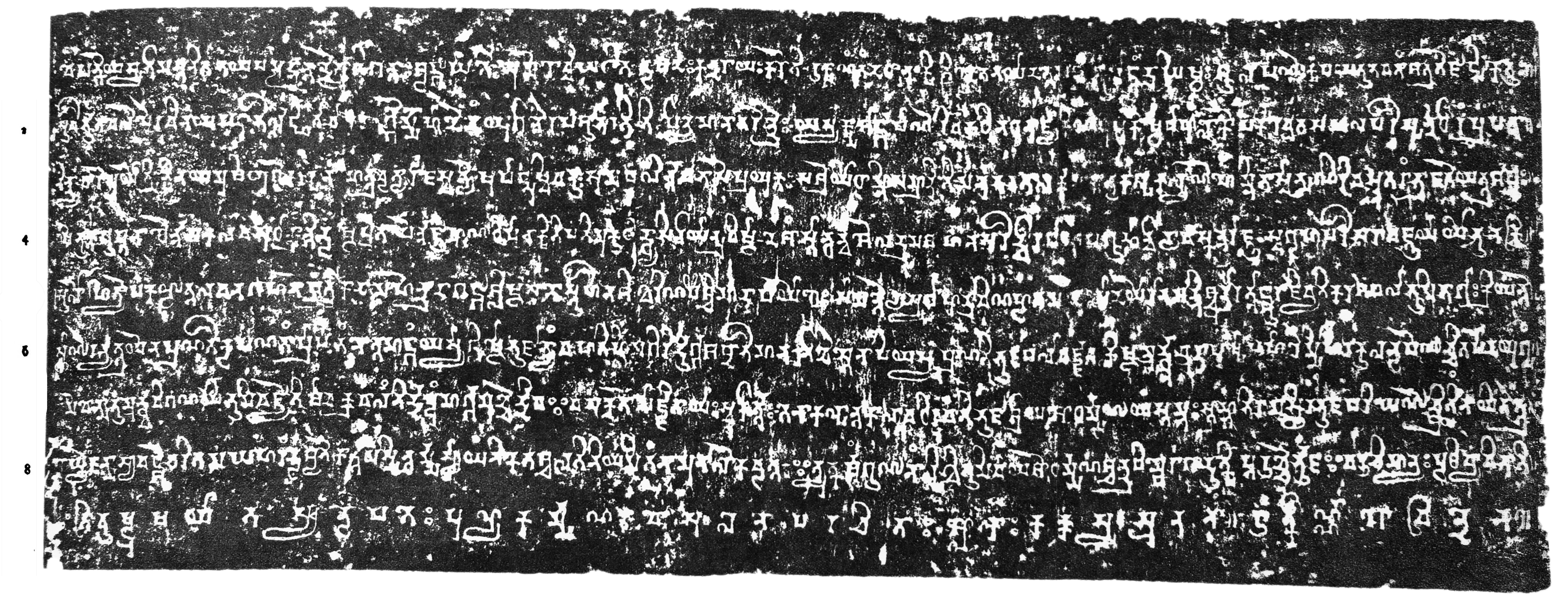
- Imprint of the Mandasor Yashodharman Inscription
- Material: Red sandstone pillar
- Writing: Sanskrit
- Created: 515–550 CE
- Period/culture: Gupta Empire era
- Discovered: 1884
- Place: Sondhani, Mandasor
- Present location: Yashodharman Museum

Location
- Yashodharman site, Mandsaur (India) Yashodharman site, Mandsaur (Madhya Pradesh)

The Mandasor Pillar Inscriptions of Yashodharman are a set of Sanskrit inscriptions from early 6th-century discovered at an archaeological site at the village of Sondani (सोंधनी), about 4 kilometers south of Mandsaur (Mandasor) in northwestern Madhya Pradesh, India. These record the victory of Aulikara king Yasodharman over the Huna king Mihirakula. According to Richard Salomon, these are notable for "their outstanding literary, calligraphic and historical value". The Mandasor inscription praises Yasodharman, describes him as having rescued the earth from "rude and cruel kings of the Kali age, who delight in viciousness".

Fleet first published his translation of the inscription in 1888. Fleet's translation of the inscription has been corrected by various scholars.

== Location ==
The inscriptions were found on a pair of pillars, at a site southeast of Mandsaur, Madhya Pradesh in what was then a small village called Sondani. The town is also referred to as Mandasor, Dasor or Dasapura in historic texts. The site contained not only the pillars but ruins of a Hindu temple and many desecrated panels and statues. They were discovered by John Fleet in 1884, and first published in 1886. It is currently at its original site, which is now housed within compounds of the Mandsaur's Yashodharman Archaeology Museum. The site was excavated by a team led by Garde in 1923, who found some of Fleet's presumptions incorrect. Garde found the foundations and ruins of a temple about 75 feet (23 m) from the pillar, likely a Shiva temple because several new inscriptions found opened with homage to Shiva and they mention a temple. He also found double human figures buried in soil below. It was of the type similar to other Gupta era site, that likely stood above the pair of pillars, before it was toppled at some point, at the site.

== Description ==
The major inscriptions exist on a pair of light red sandstone pillars. The base of the first column is rectangular. Above it is a square section, then a sixteen faced column shaft that rises vertically. Each face is about 8.5 feet (2.6 m) wide. The inscription is somewhat difficult to locate because of the hue of the stone and the antiquity of the inscription. It is 2.17 feet (0.66 m) above the base block. Near the primary pillar with inscription, Fleet found a number of ruins of panels and statues which were not a part of the pillar or inscription, but of a larger monument that went with it. Fleet noted that at the time of his 1884 visit there are "row of chisel marks all round the column here" and it was "deliberately broken by the insertion of wedges".

The inscription has survived in a form that can be traced with ink-impression technologies. It covers a space of about 3.25 feet (0.99 m) by 1.25 feet (0.38 m) area. These are in Sanskrit, Gupta script of later northern variety such as in the way the upagudha are inscribed. The text is in poetic verse form, and at the end is inscribed the name of scribe in prose.

The inscription states that Yasodharman's dominions covered the regions between Brahmaputra River (Assam) to the western ocean (Arabian Sea, Sindh) from the Himalayas (Kashmir) to the Mahendra mountains (either Odisha, or someplace in Western Ghats). It states that Mihirakula was defeated and did homage to Yasodharman. The inscriptions are not dated.

=== Inscription Pillar 1 ===
SIDDHAM has published the critically edited version of the inscription as:

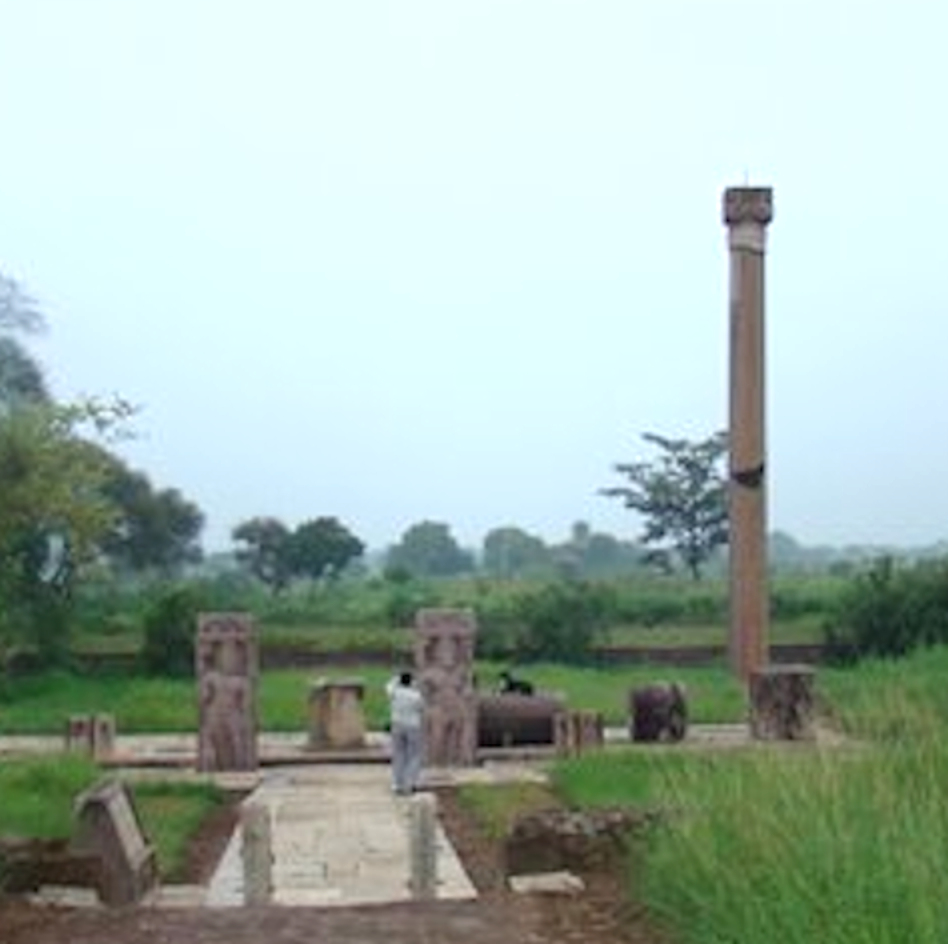
Pillar of Yashodharman at Sondani, Mandsaur, bearing the Sondani inscription.

1. vepante yasya bhīmastanitabhayasamudbhrāntadaityā digantāḥśṛṅgāghātaiḥ sumeror vvighaṭitadṛṣadaḥ kandarā yaḥ karoti|ukṣāṇaṃ taṃ dadhānaḥ kṣitidharatanayādattapañcāṅgulāṅkaṃdrāghiṣṭhaḥ śūlapāṇeḥ kṣapayatu bhavatāṃ śatrutejāṅsi ketuḥ||
2. āvirbhūtāvalepair avinayapaṭubhir llaṅghitācāramārggairmmohād aidaṃyugīnair apaśubharatibhiḥ pīḍyamānā narendraiḥ|yasya kṣmā śārṅgapāṇer iva kaṭhinadhanurjyākiṇāṅkaprakoṣṭhaṃbāhuṃ lokopakāravratasaphalaparispandadhīraṃ prapanā||
3. nindyācāreṣu yo smin vinayamuṣi yuge kalpanāmāttravṛtyārājasv anyeṣu pāṅsuṣv iva kusumabalir nnābabhāse prayuktaḥ|sa śreyodhāmni samrāḍ iti manubharatālarkkamāndhātṛkalpekalyāṇe hemni bhāsvān maṇir iva sutarāṃ bhrājate yattra śabdaḥ||
4. ye bhuktā guptanāthair nna sakala vasudhākkrāntidṛṣṭapratāpairnājñā hūṇādhipānāṃ kṣitipatimukuṭāddhyāsinī yān praviṣṭā|deśāṃs tān dhanvaśailadrumaśahanasaridvīrabāhūpagūḍhānvīryāvaskannarājñaḥ svagṛhaparisarāvajñayā yo bhunakti
5. ā lauhityopakaṇṭhāt talavanagahanopatyakād ā mahendrādā gaṅgāśliṣṭasānos tuhinaśikhariṇaf paścimād ā payodheḥ|sāmantair yasya bāhudraviṇahṛtamadaiḥ pādayor ānamadbhiścūḍāratnāṅśurājivyatikaraśabalā bhūmibhāgāḥ kriyante||
6. sthāṇor anyattra yena praṇatikṛpaṇatāṃ prāpitaṃ nottamāṅgaṃyasyāśliṣṭo bhujābhyāṃ vahati himagirir durggaśabdābhimānaM|nīcais tenāpi yasya praṇatibhujabalāvarjjanakliṣṭamūrddhnācūḍāpuṣpopahārair mmihirakulanṛpeṇārccitaṃ pādayugmaM||
7. [gā]m evonmātum ūrddhvaṃ vigaṇayitum iva jyotiṣāṃ cakkravālaṃnirddeṣṭuṃ mārggam uccair ddiva iva sukṛtopārjjitāyāḥ svakīrtteḥ|tenākalpāntakālāvadhir avanibhujā śrīyaśodharmmaṇāyaṃstambhah stambhābhirāmasthirabhujaparigheṇocchritiṃ nāyito ttra||
8. ś(l)āghye janmāsya vaṅśe caritam aghaharaṃ dṛśyate kāntam asmindharmmasyāyaṃ niketaś calati niyamitaṃ nāmunā lokavṛttaṃ|ity utkarṣaṃ guṇānāṃ likhitum iva yaśodharmmaṇaś candrabimberāgād utkṣipta uccair bhuja iva rucimān yaḥ pṛthivyā vibhāti||
9. iti tuṣṭūṣayā tasyanṛpateḥ puṇyakarmmaṇaḥ|vāsulenoparacitaḥ ślokaḥkakkasya sūnunā||utkīrṇṇā govindena||

=== Fleet's translation of Pillar 1 Inscription ===
The inscription was translated by John Faithfull Fleet in Corpus Inscriptionum Indicarum: Inscriptions of the Early Guptas in 1888:

1. "May that very long banner of (the god) Shûlapâni destroy the glory of your enemies;(that banner) which bears (a representation of) the bull (Nandi), marked by the five fingers (dipped in some dye and then) placed on him by (Pârvati) the daughter of the mountain (Himalaya), who causes the distant regions, in which the demons are driven wild with fear by (his) terrible bellowings, to shake; (and) who makes the glens of (the mountain) Sumeru to have their rocks split open by the blows of his horns!

2. He, to whose arm, as if (to the arm) of (the god) Shârngapâni,— the fore-arm of which is marked with callous parts caused by the hard string of (his) bow, (and) which is steadfast in the successful carrying out of vows for the benefit of mankind,— the earth betook itself (for succour), when it was afflicted by kings of the present age, who manifested pride; who were cruel through want of proper training; who, from delusion, transgressed the path of good conduct; (and) who were destitute of virtuous delights

3. He who, in this age which is the ravisher of good behaviour, through the action simply of (his good) intentions shone gloriously, not associating with other kings who adopted a reprehensible course of conduct,— just as an offering of flowers (is beautiful when it is not laid down) in the dust;— he in whom, possessed of a wealth of virtue, (and so) falling but little short of Manu and Bharata and Alarka and Mândhâtri, the title of "universal sovereign" shines more (than in any other), like a resplendent level (set) in good gold

4. He who, spurning (the confinement of) the boundaries of his own house, enjoys those countries,— thickly covered over with deserts and mountains and trees and thickets and rivers and strong-armed heroes, (and) having (their) kings assaulted by (his) prowess,— which were not enjoyed (even) by the lords of the Guptas, whose prowess was displayed by invading the whole (remainder of the) earth, (and) which the command of the chiefs of the Hûnas, that established itself on the tiaras of (many) kings, failed to penetrate

5. He before whose feet chieftains, having (their) arrogance removed by the strength of (his) arm, bow down, from the neighbourhood of the (river) Lauhitya (Brahmaputra River) up to (the mountain) Mahendra, the lands at the foot of which are impenetrable through the groves of palmyra-trees, (and) from (Himâlaya) the mountain of snow, the tablelands of which are embraced by the (river) Gangâ, up to the Western Ocean,— by which (all) the divisions of the earth are made of various hues through the intermingling of the rays of the jewels in the locks of hair on the tops of (their) heads

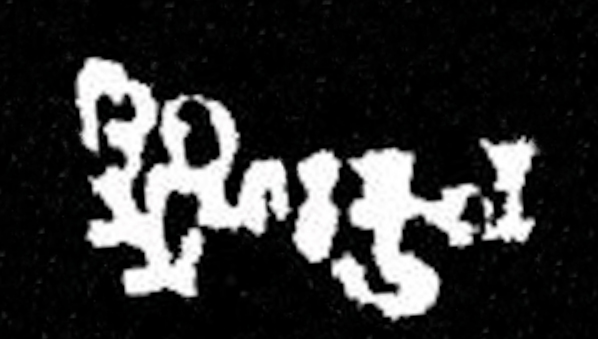
The name "Mihirakula" (Gupta script:, Mmihirakula) in line 6 of the duplicate Mandasor Pillar Inscriptions of Yasodharman. The name also appears in the main inscription.

6. He by whom (his) head has never been brought into the humility of obeisance to any other save (the god) Sthânu;— he, through the embraces of whose arms (Himâlaya) the mountain of snow carries no longer the pride of the title of being a place that is difficult of access;— he to whose two feet respect was paid, with complimentary presents of the flowers from the lock of hair on the top of (his) head, by even that (famous) king Mihirakula, whose forehead was pained through being bent low down by the strength of (his) arm in (the act of compelling) obeisance

7. By him, the king, the glorious Yashodharman, the firm beams of whose arms are as charming as pillars, this column, which shall endure to the time of the destruction of the world, has been erected here,— as if to measure out the earth; as if to enumerate on high the multitude of the heavenly lights; (and) as if to point out the path of his own fame to the skies above, acquired by good actions;

8. (this column) which shines refulgent, as if it were a lofty arm of the earth, raised up in joy to write upon the surface of the moon the excellence of the virtues of Yashôdharman, to the effect that— "His birth (is) in a lineage that is worthy to be eulogised; there is seen in him a charming behaviour that is destructive of sin; he is the abode of religion; (and) the (good) customs of mankind continue current, unimpeded (in any way) by him.

9. From a desire thus to praise this king, of meritorious actions, (these) verses have been composed by Vâsula, the son of Kakka. (This eulogy) has been engraved by Gôvinda."

— Mandsaur Pillar Inscription of Yashodharman

=== Corrections to Fleet's translation ===
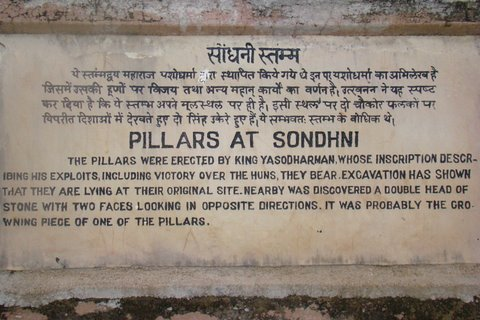
Info of Victory pillar of Yashodharman at Sondani, Mandsaur

Scholars have published a series of papers that question Fleet's translation and some have proposed significant revisions. For example, Lorenz Franz Kielhorn published the following corrections, which Fleet concurred is a better translation:

- Line 3: He, in whom, possessed of a wealth of virtue, (and so) failing but little short of Manu and Bharata and Alarka and Mandhatri, the title of 'universal sovereign' - which in this age that is the ravisher of good behavior, applied with a mere imaginary meaning to other kings, of reprehensible conduct, has not shone at all, (being in their case) like an offering of flowers (placed) in the dust, - shines even more (that it ordinarily does), like a resplendent jewel (set) in good gold.
- Line 6: He (Yasodharman) to whose two feet respect was paid, with complementary presents of the flowers from the lock of hair on the top of (his) head, by even that (famous) king Mihirakula, whose head had never (previously) been brought into the humility of obeisance to any other save (the god) Sthanu, (and) embraced by whose arms the mountain of snow falsely prides itself on being styled an inaccessible fortress, (and) whose forehead was pained through being (now for the first time) bent low down by the strength of (his) arm in (the act of compelling) obeisance.

=== Other inscriptions ===
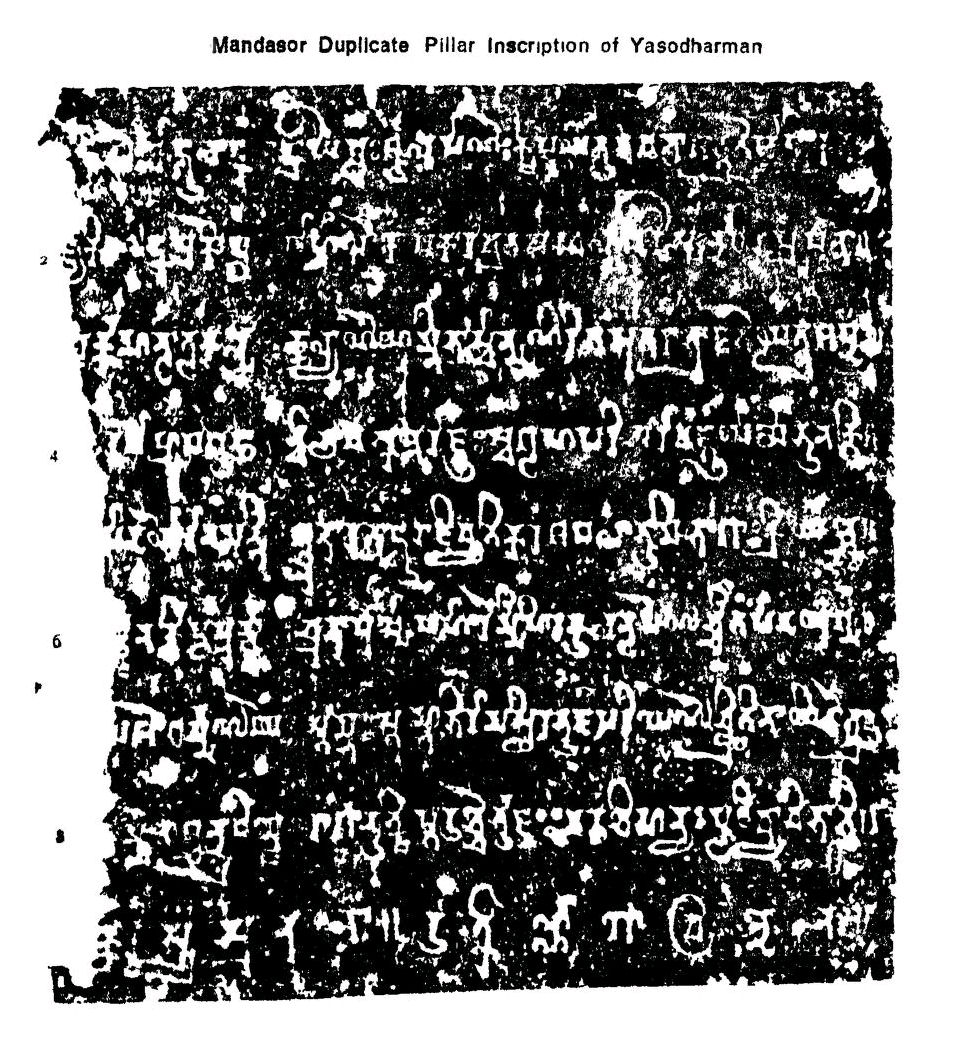
The duplicate, but partial, Mandasor Pillar Inscription of Yasodharman.

Several additional inscriptions were discovered at the same Mandasor site by Fleet and other scholars between 1884 and 1923. One of these is a duplicate, but with many lines lost because of damage at some point later.

== Significance ==
According to Sagar, the Huna king Toramana was cruel and barbaric, Mihirakula even more so, during their rule. Mihirakula had conquered Sindh by 520 CE, had a large elephant and cavalry-driven army. Mihirkula destroyed Buddhist sites, ruined monasteries, according to Sagar. Yashodharman, about 532 CE, reversed Mihirakula's campaign and started the end of Mihirakula era. Other scholars state that there are many legends surrounding this era and historical facts are difficult to ascertain. The Chinese pilgrim Xuanzang (Hsuan Tsang) mentions Mihirakula as conquering Kashmir first, then Gandhara, then attempting to conquer central and eastern India, but getting vanquished by Yashodharman and Narasimhagupta Baladitya. Mihirakula was captured during the war, but his life spared because Baladitya's mother intervened and argued against capital punishment.
