= Aulikara dynasty (disambiguation) =

Aulikara dynasty may refer to-

- First Aulikara dynasty, the first royal house belonging to the ancient Aulikara clan
- Second Aulikara dynasty, the second dynasty belonging to the Aulikara clan
- Aulikara Empire, founded by Yashodharman of the Second Aulikara dynasty
- Aulikara, an ancient clan
