= Gwalior inscription of Mihirakula =

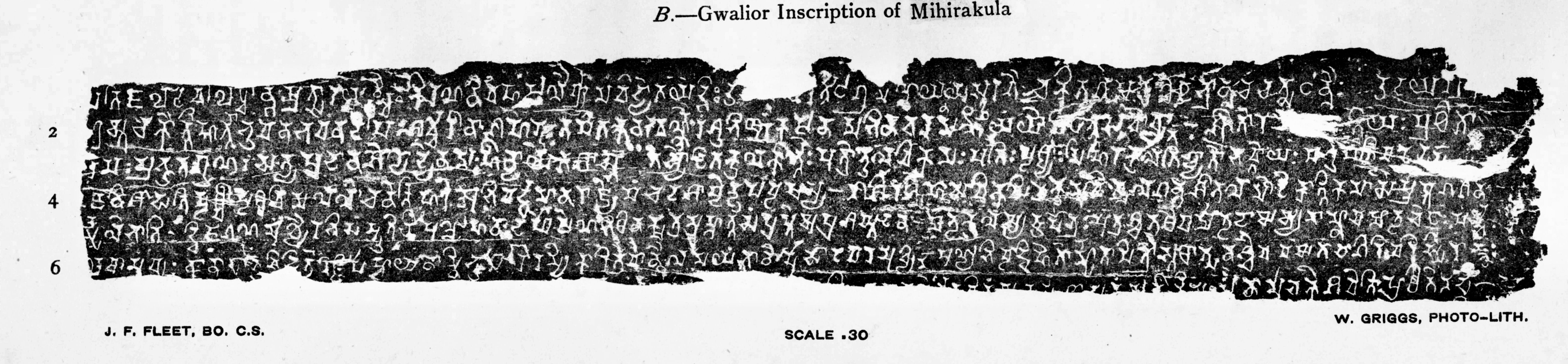
- Gwalior inscription of Mihirakula. Actual photograph
- Material: Red sandstone slab
- Writing: Sanskrit
- Created: 6th century
- Period/culture: Gupta era
- Discovered: Gwalior Fort
- Place: Gwalior Fort
- Present location: Indian Museum, Kolkata

Location
- Gwalior (India) Gwalior (Madhya Pradesh) Gwalior (Asia)

The Gwalior inscription of Mihirakula is a 6th-century Sanskrit inscription recording the construction of a Surya temple in the Gwalior Fort from stone on the Gopa hill of Gwalior. Though now referred with the name of Mihirakula, the temple and the inscription was commissioned by his official Matricheta. The original temple is lost, and the inscribed red-sandstone slab was found in 1861 by Alexander Cunningham in the porch of another temple, and published in 1861. This inscribed stone from Gwalior was moved shortly after its discovery to the Kolkata Museum for preservation. Several translations of it have been published thereafter. It is damaged, its script is the northern class of ancient Gupta script and the entire composition is in poetic verse.

It is notable for mentioning in the first part of the sixth century CE, and the rule of the two Hūṇa kings Toramana and Mihirakula.

== Location ==
Gwalior is located in northern Madhya Pradesh, India. The shrine probably stood on the edge of the tank known as Surāj Kuṇḍ on Gwalior Fort. The inscription is in the Indian Museum.

== Publication ==
The inscription was found by Cunningham, who published it in 1861. Rajendralal Mitra published its first interpretation and translation in 1862. At this time, nine lines of text were extant on the broken slab. The inscription was damaged, with first 2-3 characters of every line lost. After its discovery, more lines were lost before the slab was removed and shifted to the Imperial Museum at Calcutta (now the Indian Museum, Kolkata). Now only seven lines can be studied. John Faithfull Fleet published an interpolated version of this inscription, and a translation of the reconstructed inscription in 1888. It was subsequently noted by Bhandarkar, Garde, Dvivedī and Willis in their respective epigraphic lists. An edition was published by D. C. Sircar in his Select Inscriptions.

== Description and contents ==
The inscription is on red sandstone, written in Sanskrit and mostly a poetic verse about god Surya, suggesting it originated in the Saura tradition of Hinduism. The purport is to record that a stone temple was built for the god on the Gopa hill in the month of Kārttika, a hill that is now found in southern part of the Gwalior Fort. The stone temple is now missing. It mentions the name of the sponsor to be Matricheta, the son of Matridasa, was the patron.

It does not mention the year or era, but mentions the 15th year of Mihirakula, giving this inscription a part of its name and making it a significant historical record.

== Inscription ==
Siddham has published the critically edited version of the inscription as:

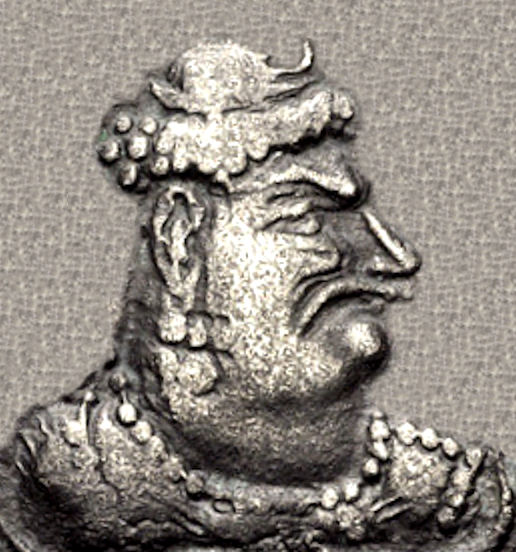
Portrait of Mihirakula from his coinage. He is mentioned in line 3 of the Gwalior inscription.

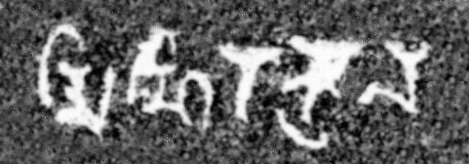
The name "Mihirakula" (Gupta script:, Mi-hi-ra-ku-la) in line 3 of the Gwalior inscription.

1. [*][*ja](ya)ti jaladavāladhvāntam utsārayan svaiḥkiraṇanivahajālair vyoma vidyotayadbhiḥu[*daya-gi](r)[*i]taṭāgra[*ṃ] maṇḍaya{+n} yas tura(ṃ)gaiḥcakitagamanakhedabhrāntacaṃcatsaṭāntaiḥ|udayag[*i](r)[*i]
2. [⏑--](gra)stacakro rttiharttābhuvanabhavanadīpaḥ śarvvarīnāśahetuḥtapitakanakavarṇṇair aṃśubhif paṃkajān(ā)mabhinavaramaṇīyaṃ yo (vi)dhatte sa vo vyāT|śrītora(m)[āṇa i]ti yaḥ prathito
3. [*?bhū-ca](?kra)paḥ prabhūtaguṇaḥsatyapradānaśauryād yena mahī nyāyata(śā)stātasyoditakulakīrtteḥ putro tulavikramaḥ patiḥ pṛthvyāḥmihirakuleti khyāto bhaṅgo yaḥ paśupati(m a)[#3#]
4. [*tasmin rā]jani śāsati pṛthvīṃ pṛthuvimalalocane rttihareabhivarddhamānarājye paṃcadaśābde nṛpavṛṣasya|śaśiraśmihāsavikasitakumudotpalagandhaśītalāmodekārttikamāse prāpta gagana
5. [*?patau][*ni]rmmale bhāti|dvijagaṇamukhyair abhisaṃstute ca puṇyāhanādaghoṣeṇatithinakṣatramuhūrtte saṃprāpte supraśastad(i)ne|mātṛtulasya tu pautraḥ putraś ca tathaiva mātṛdāsasyanāmnā ca mātṛcetaḥ parvva-
6. [*ta][-⏑][*?pu](ra)vās(t)av(y)aḥnānādhātuvicitre gopāhvayanāmni bhūdhare ramyekāritavān śailamayaṃ bhānoḥ prāsādavaramukhyaM|puṇyābhivṛddhihetor mmātāpitros tathātmanaś caivavasatā ca girivare smi rājñaḥ
7. [...](?pā)denaye kārayanti bhānoś candrāṃśusamaprabhaṃ gṛhapravaraṃteṣāṃ vāsaḥ svargge yāvatkalpakṣayo bhavati||bhaktyā raver vviracitaṃ saddharmmakhyāpanaṃ sukīrttimayaṃnāmnā ca keśaveti prathitena ca{-|}
8. [...](?di)tyena||yāvaccharvvajaṭākalāpagahane vidyotate candramādivyastrīcaraṇair vvibhūṣitataṭo yāvac ca merur nagaḥyāvac corasi nīlanīradanibhe viṣṇur vvibharty ujvalāṃśrīṃ{-s} tāvad girimūrdhni tiṣṭhati
9. [*?śilā-prā]sādamukhyo rame||

== Translation ==
John Fleet in 1888 interpolated and translated the surviving portions of the inscription as follows:

"[Ôm!] May he (the Sun) protect you, who is victorious,-dispelling the darkness of the banks of clouds with the masses of the multitude of his rays that light up the sky; (and) decorating the top of the side of the mountain of dawn with (his) horses, which have the tossing ends of (their) manes deshevelled through the fatigue (induced) by (their) startled gait;-(and) who,-having (his) chariot-wheels (?) swallowed (?)............. The mountain of dawn; dispelling distress; (being) the light of the house which is the world; (and) effecting the destruction of night,-creates the fresh beauty of the waterlilies by (his) rays which are of the colour of molten gold!

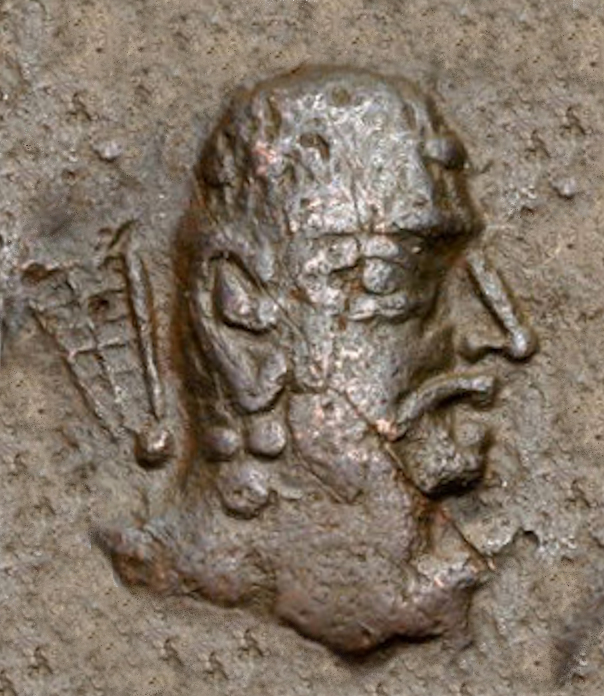
Portrait of Toramana, mentioned in line 2 of the Gwalior inscription.

(Line 2.)-(There was) a ruler of [the earth], of great merit, who was renowned by the name of the glorious Tôramâna; by whom, through (his) heroism that was specially characterised by truthfulness, the earth was governed with justice.

(L. 3.)-Of him, the fame of whose family has risen high, the son (is) he, of unequalled prowess, the lord of the earth, who is renowned under the name of Mihirakula, (and) who, (himself) unbroken, [broke the power of] Pasupati.

(L. 4.)-While [he], the king, the remover of distress, possessed of large and pellucid eyes, is governing the earth; in the augmenting reign, (and) in the fifteenth year, of (him) the best of kings; the month Kârttika, cool and fragrant with the perfume of the red and blue waterlilies that are caused to blossom by the smiles of the rays of the moon, having come; while the spotless moon is shining; and a very auspicious day,-heralded by the chiefs of the classes of the twice-born with the noise of the proclamation of a holy day, (and) possessed of the (proper) tithi and nakshatra and muhûrta,-having arrived;-

(L. 5.)-The son's son of Matritula, and the son of Mâtridâsa, by the name Mâtrichêta, an inhabitant of ............ on the hill, has caused to be made, on the delightful mountain which is speckled with various metals and has the appelation of Gopa, a stone temple, the chief among the best of temples, of the Sun, for the purpose of increasing the religious merit of (his) parents and of himself, and of those who, by the ......... of the king, dwell on this best of mountains.

(L. 6.)-Those who cause to be made an excellent house of the Sun, like in lustre to the rays of the moon,-their abode is in heaven, until the destruction of all things!

(L. 7.)-(This) very famous proclamation of the true religion has been composed through devotion to the Sun, by him who is renowned by the name of Kesava and by.... ditya.

(L. 8.)-As long as the moon shines on the thicket that is the knot of the braided hair of (the god) Sarva; and as long as the mountain Mêru continues to have (its) slopes adorned by the feet of the nymphs of heaven; and as long as (the god) Vishnu bears the radiant (goddess) Srî upon (his) breast which is like a dark-blue cloud;-so long (this) chief of [stone]-temples shall stand upon the delightful summit of the hill!"

— John F Fleet

== See also ==
- Indian inscriptions
- Eran boar inscription of Toramana
