= Second Aulikara dynasty =

4th to 6th century dynasty in Indian subcontinent

Kingdom of Malava
- 350–545
- Capital: Daśapura
- Religion: Official: Vaishnavism (6th c. prior); Shaivism (6th c. onwards)
- Government: Absolute monarchy
- Rajadhiraja
  - 350–375: Jayavarman (first)
  - 515–545: Yashodharman (last)
- Historical era: Classical Era; Early Mediaeval Era
  - House of Aulikara established: 350
  - Death of Yashodharman: 545
| Preceded by | Succeeded by |
| Malava Republic | Later Gupta dynasty |
- Today part of: India

The Second Aulikara dynasty (Late Brahmi script: Au-li-ka-rā) was a royal dynasty that ruled over the Kingdom of Daśapura, and at its peak under Yashodharman Vishnuvardhana controlled a vast area, consisting of almost all of Northern India (excluding the east) and parts of Deccan plateau. It was the second royal house of the Aulikara clan.

== Origins ==
The dynasty belonged to the ancient clan of the Aulikaras, and was the second royal house belonging to this clan.

== Territory ==
In the Mandsaur pillar inscription, Yashodharman claims he controlled the territory from the neighbourhood of Lauhitya (Brahmaputra River) to the "Western Ocean" (Western Indian Ocean), and from the Himalayas to mountain Mahendra. He also claims he defeated the Hunas at Sondani.

The second Aulikara dynasty initially controlled the Malwa plateau, but at its peak under Yashodharman Vishnuvardhana controlled a vast area, consisting of almost all of Northern India and northern parts of the Deccan plateau.

=== Establishment ===
Aulikara rulers such as Adityavardhana and Dravyavardhana expanded their kingdom and one of their successors Yashodharman conquered vast territories from the Hunas and Guptas after the Battle of Sondani, defeating the Huna Chief Mihirakula around 528 A.D., thus establishing the short-lived Aulikara empire. Yashodharman's capitol was almost certainly Dashapura, probably established by Yashodharman though initially thought to have been Ujjayinī, which has since been disproven. Kingdoms such as the Later Guptas and Maukhari dynasty were their vassals.

=== Decline ===
Most of the empire disintegrated after Yashodharman's death. Nothing is known about the dynasty after his death, and Malwa was conquered by the Kalachuris of Mahishmati.

After the collapse of Aulikara power in Northern India, the Later Guptas and Maukharis began fighting for imperial supremacy.

== History ==
Unlike the first Aulikara royal house, this royal house was never a Gupta feudatory.

=== Drumavardhana or Drapavardhana ===
The earliest known member of the second Aulikara dynasty is Drumavardhana (c. 5th century), whom the Rīsthal inscription describes as a Senapati (warlord). K.V. Ramesh and S.P. Tiwari read the name as Drapavardhana, while V.V. Mirashi reads it as Drumavardhana. Historian Ajay Mitra Shastri considers both readings as reasonable, but prefers Mirashi's reading because the term "Drapa-vardhana" is meaningless in Sanskrit. Dániel Balogh considers the reading to be "Drapa" based on a comparison of the various occurrences of the ligatures "pa" and "ma", and finds "not the slightest indication" of an "u" matra (vowel symbol). He agrees that the meaning of the name "Drapa-vardhana" is not clear, but also points out that the name "Druma-vardhana" (Sanskrit for "tree grower") does not suit a Senapati. He considers several possibilities, for example (1) "Drapa" was a non-Sanskrit name and the king's successors added "vardhana" to the name (2) the actual name was "Darpa-vardhana" (Sanskrit for "increaser of pride"), but the composer of the inscription changed it to "Drapa-vardhana" to fit the metre.

Drapa-vardhana probably served the first Aulikara dynasty as a Senapati, and apparently continued to use the title even after he became a king.

=== Drapa-vardhana's successors ===
Drapa-vardhana was succeeded by his son Jayavardhana, who commanded a formidable army. He was succeeded by his son Ajitavardhana. According to the Risthal inscription, he was constantly engaged in performing Soma sacrifices. Ajitavardhana was succeeded by his son Vibhishanavardhana. He was praised in the Risthal inscription for his noble qualities. Vibhishanavardhana's son and successor Rajyavardhana expanded his ancestral kingdom. Rajyavardhana was succeeded by his son Prakashadharma.

=== Prakashadharma ===
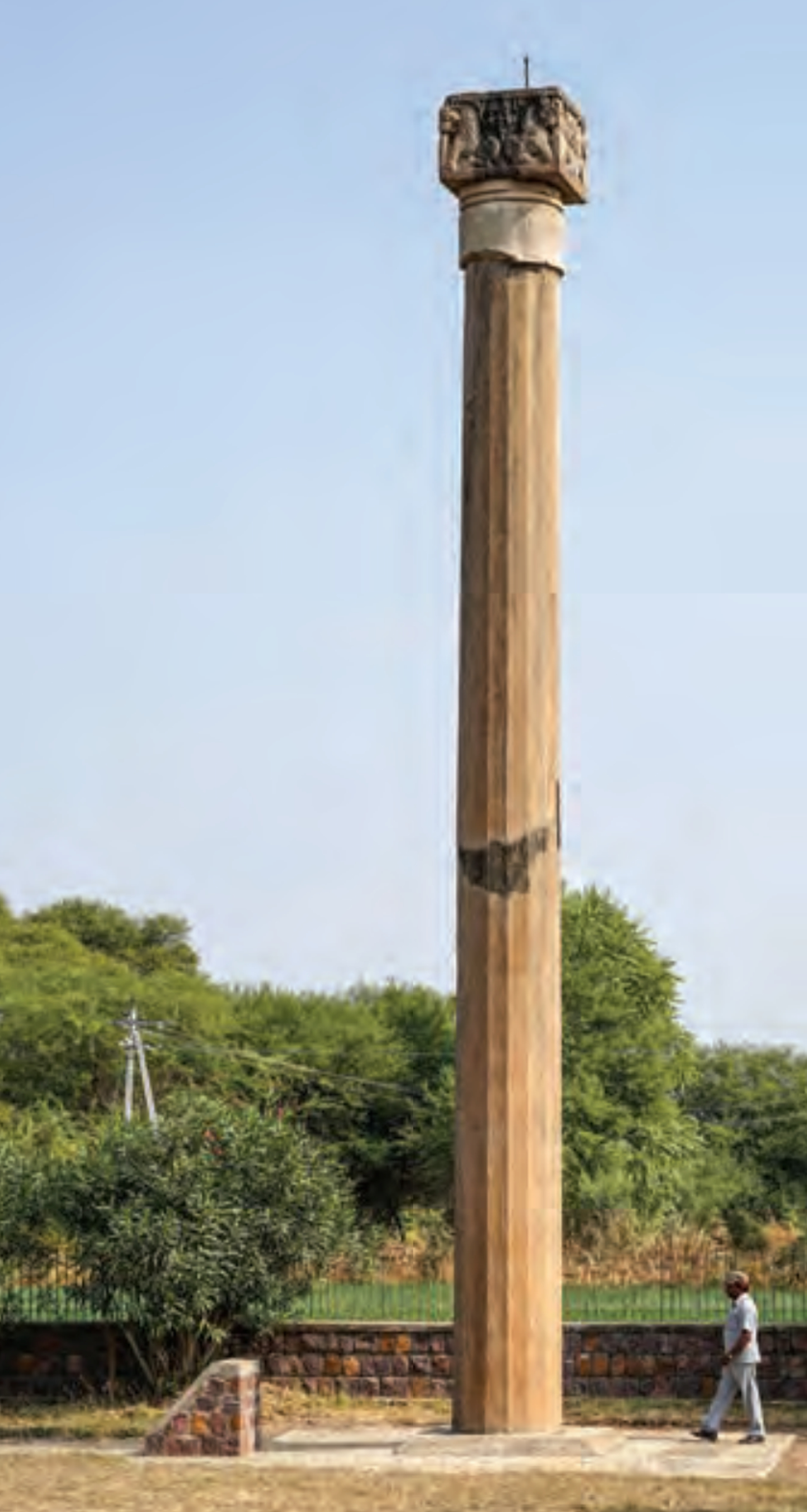
The victory pillar of Sondani, commemorating the victory of the Aulikaras against the Alchon Huns.

Prakashadharma was a notable king of this dynasty, who assumed the title, Adhiraja. The Rīsthal inscription gives us information about his achievements.

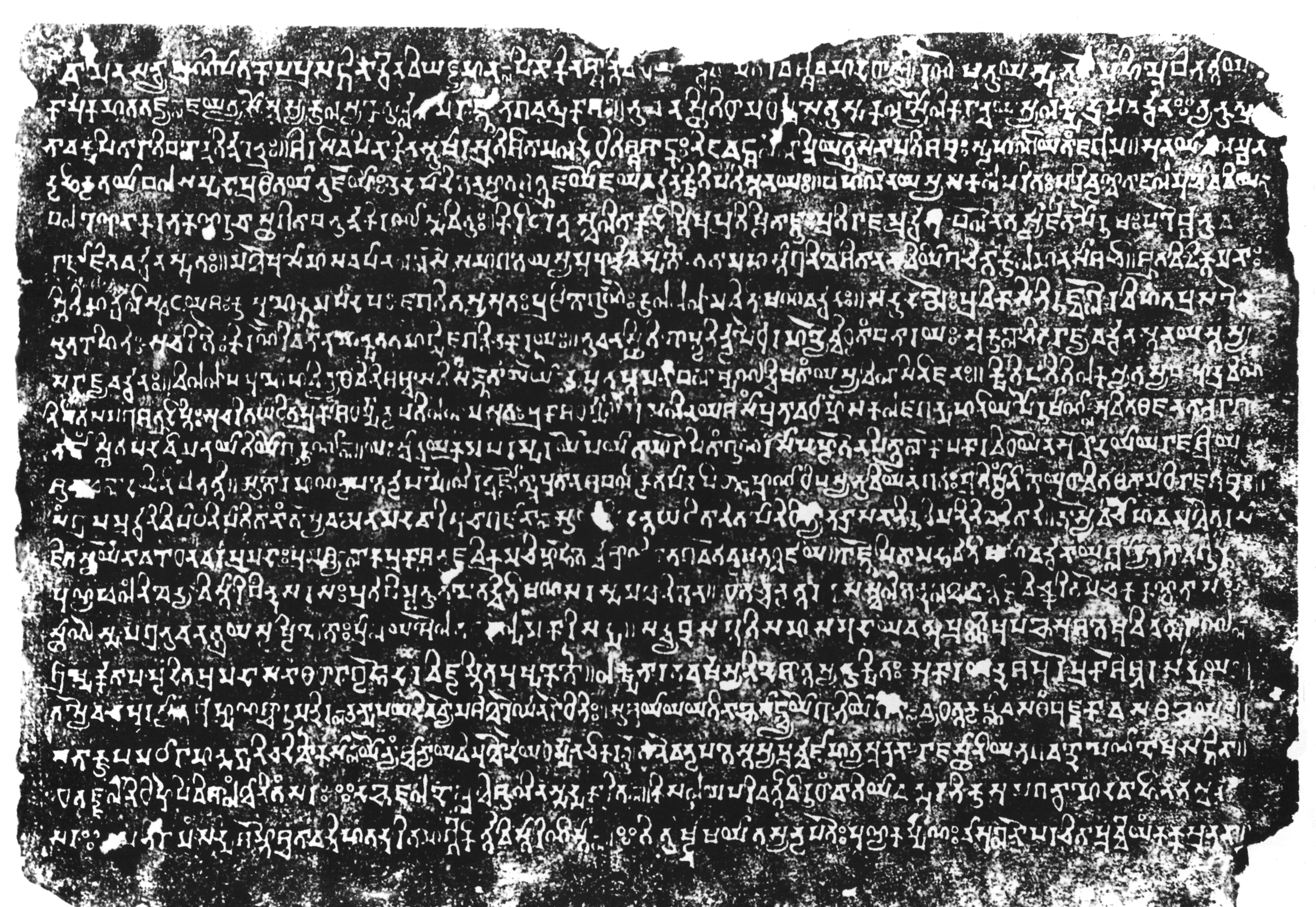
Rīsthal inscription of Prakashadharma

It records the construction of a tank and a Shiva temple at Risthal by Bhagavaddosha, a Rajasthaniya (viceroy) of Prakashadharma. This inscription mentions that Prakashadharma defeated the Huna ruler Toramana, sacked his camp and had taken away the ladies of his harem. The tank constructed at Risthal during his reign was named after his grandfather as Vibhishanasara. He also constructed a temple dedicated to Brahma at Dashapura. During the excavation at Mandsaur in 1978 by a team of Vikram University, Ujjain, led by V.S. Wakankar, his two glass seals inscribed with the legend Shri Prakashadharma were found. In all probabilities he was succeeded by his son Yashodharma Vishnuvarma.

An undated fragmentary Mandsaur inscription provides a name of a suzerain ruler Adityavardhana and his feudatory Maharaja Gauri. Adityavardhana has been recently identified with Prakashadharma by a historian Ashvini Agarwal. The Chhoti Sadri inscription dated Malava Samvat 547 (490 CE) and written by Bhramarasoma, son of Mitrasoma supplies a genealogy of Adityavardhana's feudatory ruler, Maharaja Gauri. The first ruler of this Manavayani kshatriya family was Punyasoma. He was succeeded by his son Rajyavardhana. Rashtravardhana was the son of Rajyavardhana. Rashtravardhana's son and successor was Yashogupta. The last ruler of this family, Gauri was son of Yashogupta. He excavated a tank at Dashapura for the merit of his deceased mother. This inscription also mentions the name of a prince, Gobhata but his relationship with Gauri is not known.

=== Yashodharman ===
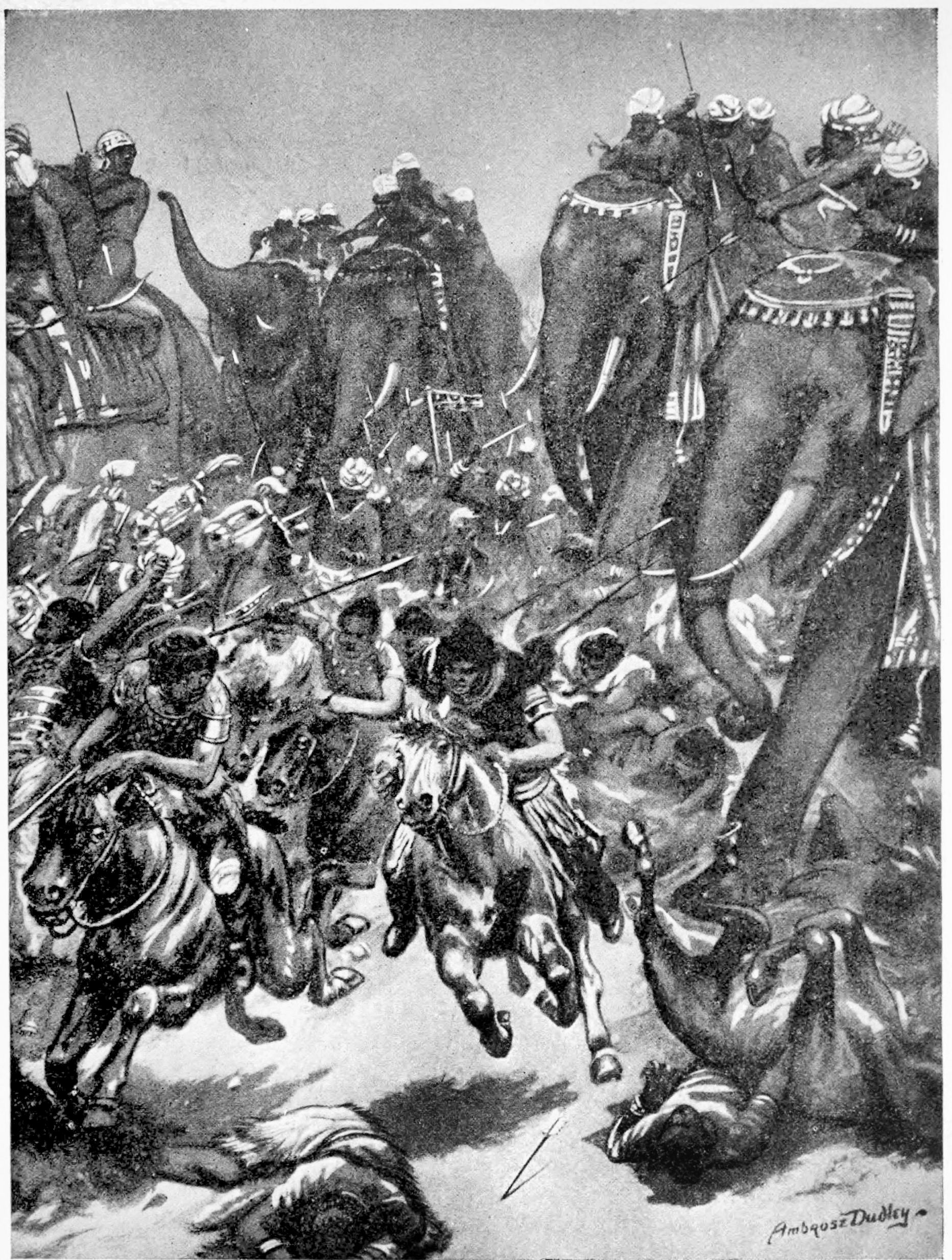
The defeat of the Alchon Huns under Mihirakula by King Yashodharma at Sondani in 528 CE.

The most prominent and greatest king of this dynasty was Yashodharma Vishnuvardhana. Yashodharma's two identical undated Mandsaur victory pillar inscriptions (found at Sondani, near present-day Mandsaur town) and a stone inscription dated Malava Samvat 589 (532 CE) record the military achievements of him. All of these inscriptions were first published by John Faithfull Fleet in 1886. The undated pillar inscriptions, which were also written by poet Vasula, son of Kakka say that his feet were worshipped by the Huna ruler Mihirakula. These also state that his feudatories from the vicinity of the river Lauhitya (Brahmaputra) in the east, from the Mahendra mountains (Eastern Ghats) in the south, up to the Himalayas in the north and the Paschima Payodhi (Western Ocean) in the west came to the seat of his empire to pay homage. he assumed the titles, Rajadhiraja and Parameshvara. Yashodharma's dated inscription informs us that in 532 CE, Nirdosha, his Rajasthaniya was governing the area between the Vindhyas and the Pariyatras (Aravalis) and his headquarters was Dashapura. Probably the rule of the Aulikaras ended with Yashodharma

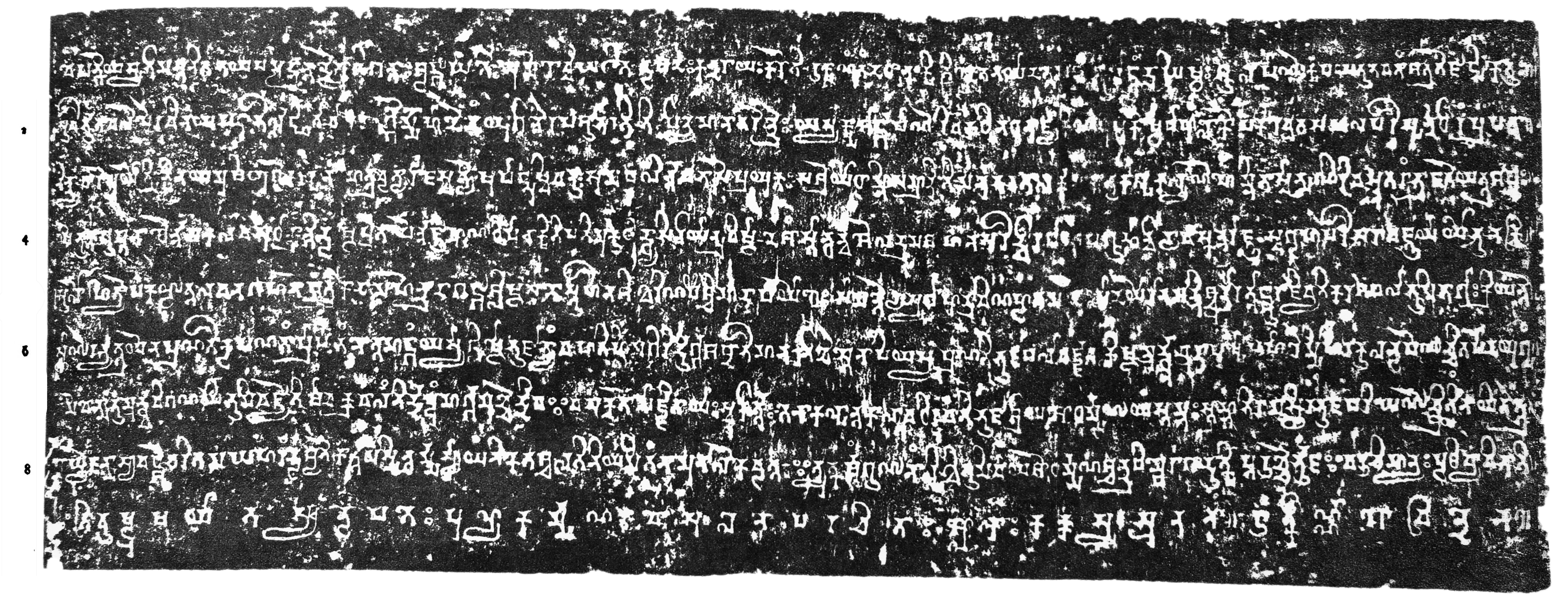
Mandasor stone pillar inscription of Yashodharman.

In Line 5 of the Mandsaur pillar inscription, Yashodharman is said to have vanquished his enemies and to now control the territory from the neighbourhood of the (river) Lauhitya (Brahmaputra River) to the "Western Ocean" (Western Indian Ocean), and from the Himalayas to mountain Mahendra.

Yashodharman thus conquered vast territories from the Hunas and the Guptas, although his short-lived empire would ultimately disintegrate between 530 and 540 CE.

=== Dravyavardhana ===
The 6th century astronomer Varahamihira mentions Dravyavardhana as the king of Avanti, who likely belonged to the Aulikara family.

Most scholars consider Dravyavardhana to be the immediate successor or predecessor of Yashodharman. Historian Ajay Mitra Shastri theorizes that Dravyavardhana was a distinct king who flourished sometime after Yashodharman alias Vishnuvardhana. Varahamihira states that one of the sources for his Bṛhat Saṃhitā was a text on astrology by Dravya-vardhana; the king had written this text after consulting another work by Bharadvaja. According to Shastri, Varahamihira holds Dravya-vardhana in high regard, mentioning his work before other reputed authorities (such as the Seven Sages and Garga), and using the honorific Shri only for him. According to Shastri, this suggests that Dravyavardhana was a contemporary of, and possibly, the royal patron of Varahamihira.

Shastri's main argument is that according to the Risthal inscription, Drapa-vardhana was a senapati (warlord), while according to Varahamihira, Dravya-vardhana was a maharajadhiraja (emperor). Balogh notes that Varahamihira actually uses the term nrpo maharajadhiraja-kah (nrpa or ruler "connected to the emperor") for the king and that only one manuscript reads maharajadhirajah, which he considers to be unimportant as it doesn't fit the metre; three others have maharajdhiraja-jah. Based on this, Balogh concludes that the actual title of Drapa-vardhana was nrpa, which is much closer to senapati in status. Utpala, the author of the earliest extant commentary on Bṛhat Saṃhitā, interprets the term maharajadhiraja-kah to mean "born in the dynasty of the (or an) emperor". Hans Bakker interprets the term to maharajadhiraja-kah as a governor installed at Ujjayini by the contemporary Gupta emperor. Balogh suggests that Dravya-vardhana was probably same as Drapa-vardhana: "Dravya" may be a variant arising from a mistake in a medieval manuscript, which is the source of later manuscripts.

== Art and architecture ==
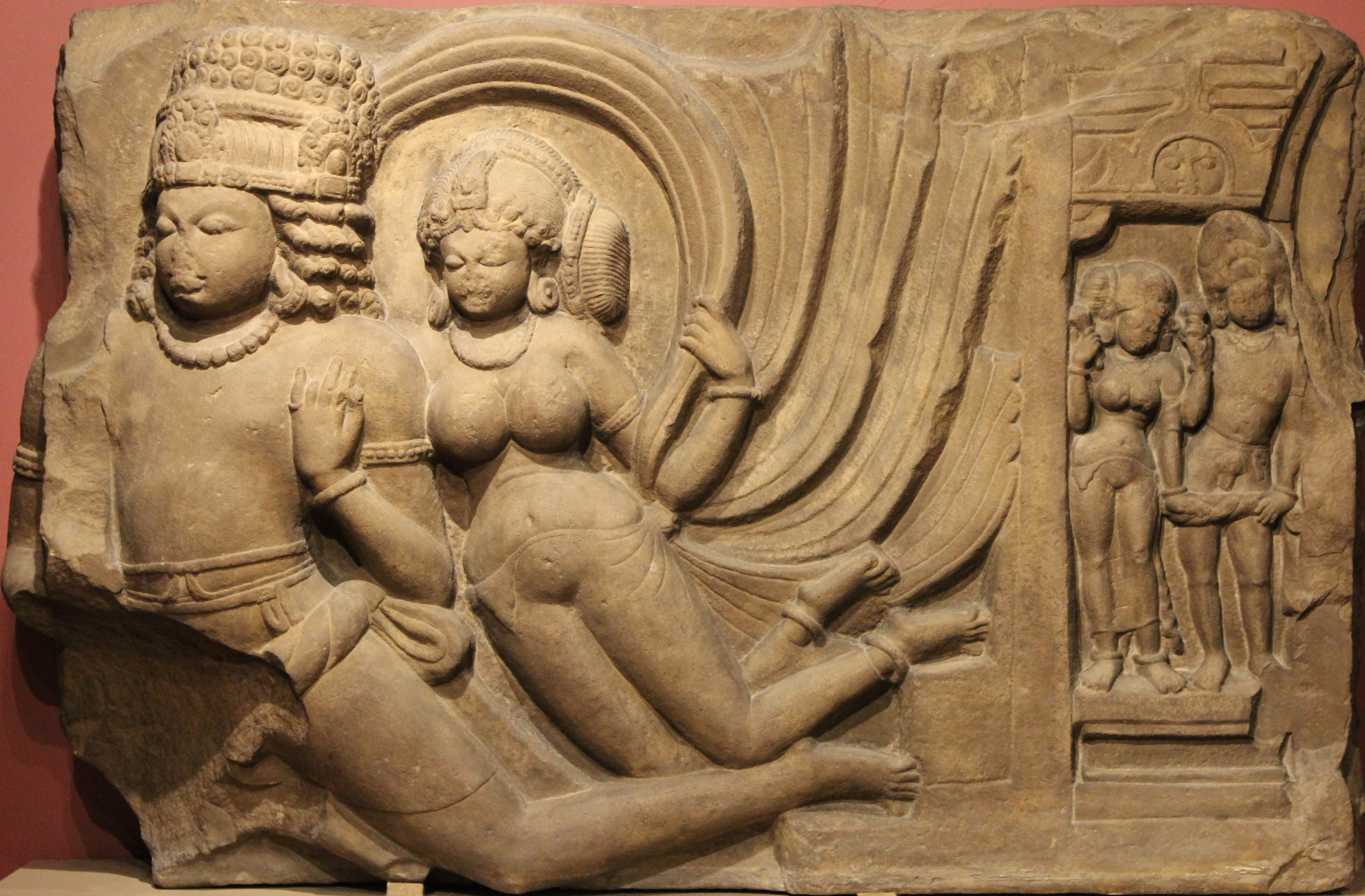
Vidyadhara, Sondani, circa 525 CE. National Museum, New Delhi.

The most significant monuments which definitely belong to the Aulikara period are two freestanding victory pillars of Yashodharma Vishnuvardhana bearing his inscriptions. These almost identical pillars, situated at Sondani, a suburb about 2 kilometers to the southeast of the Aulikara capital of Mandsaur, are made of sandstone. The height of the entire column is 44 ft 5 in. Its square base is 4 ft 5 in high and 3 ft 4 in wide. The bell-shaped capital is 5 ft 2 in high. Its shaft is sixteen faced round. Most probably there was a crowning statue, which has not been found. The sculptures at Sondani and surrounding areas of Mandsaur are a good marker for the final period of Gupta Art, as they were commissioned by Yasodharman (ruled 515 – 545 CE) around 525 CE, in celebration of his victory against the Alchon Hun king Mihirakula. This corresponds to the last phase of Gupta cultural and political unity in the subcontinent, and after that point and for the next centuries, Indian politics became extremely fragmented, with the territory being divided between smaller dynasties. The art of Sondani is considered as transitional between Gupta art and the art of Medieval India: it represents "an aesthetic which hovered between the classical decorum of Gupta art on the one hand and on the other the medieval canons which subordinated the figure to the larger religious purpose".

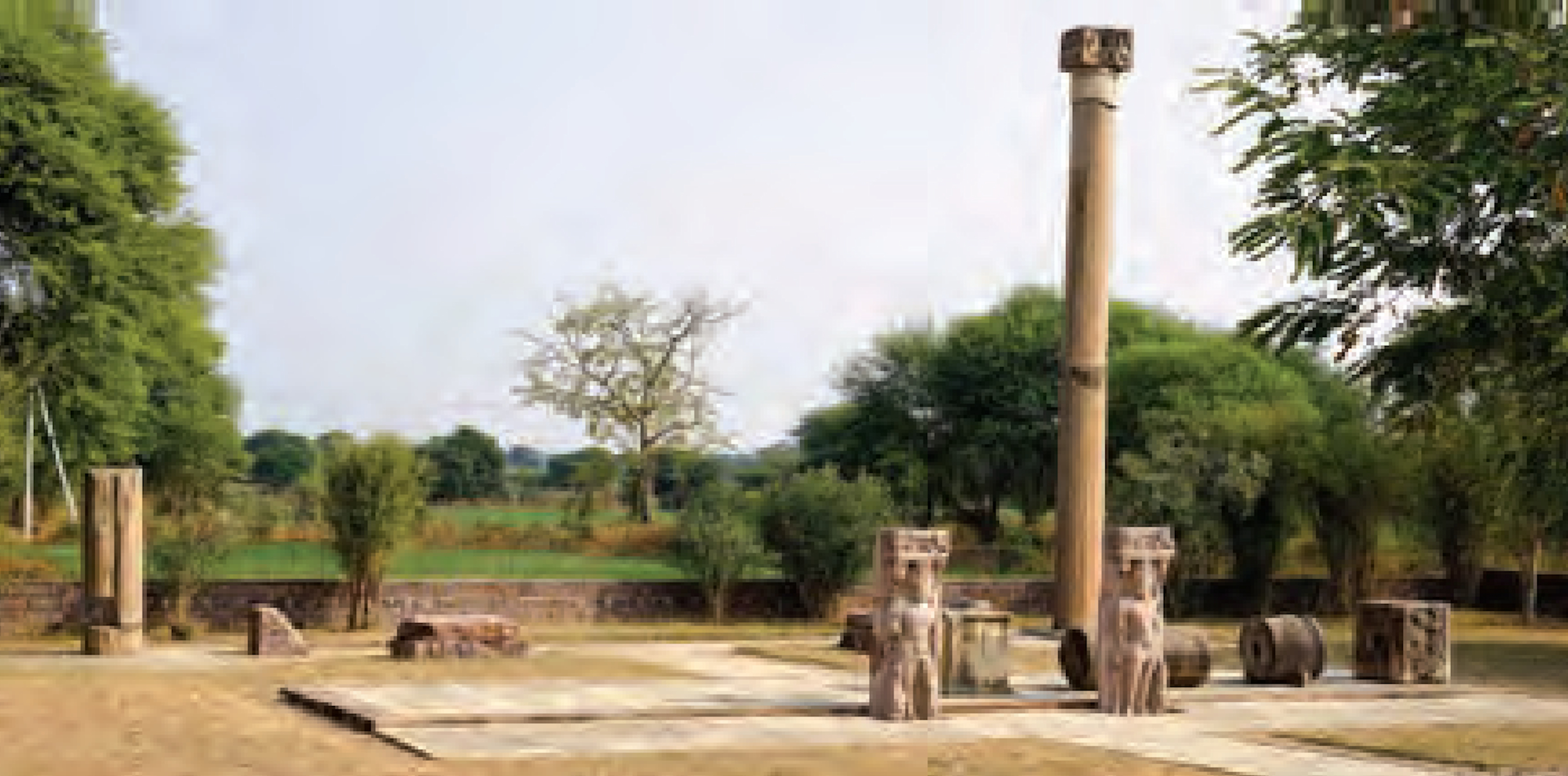
A victory pillar of Yashodharma at Sondani, Mandsaur district

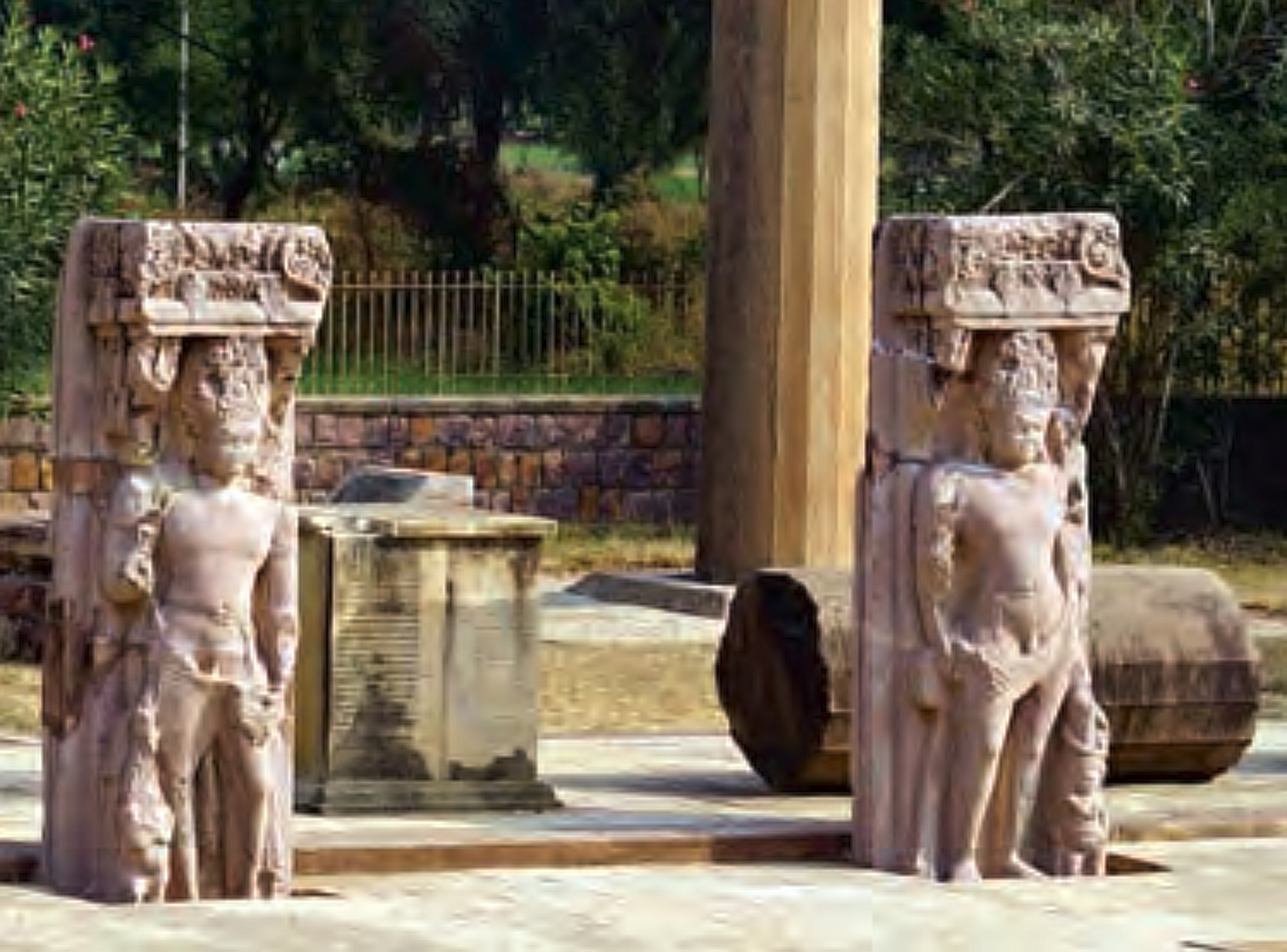
Sondhni, two Dvarapalas

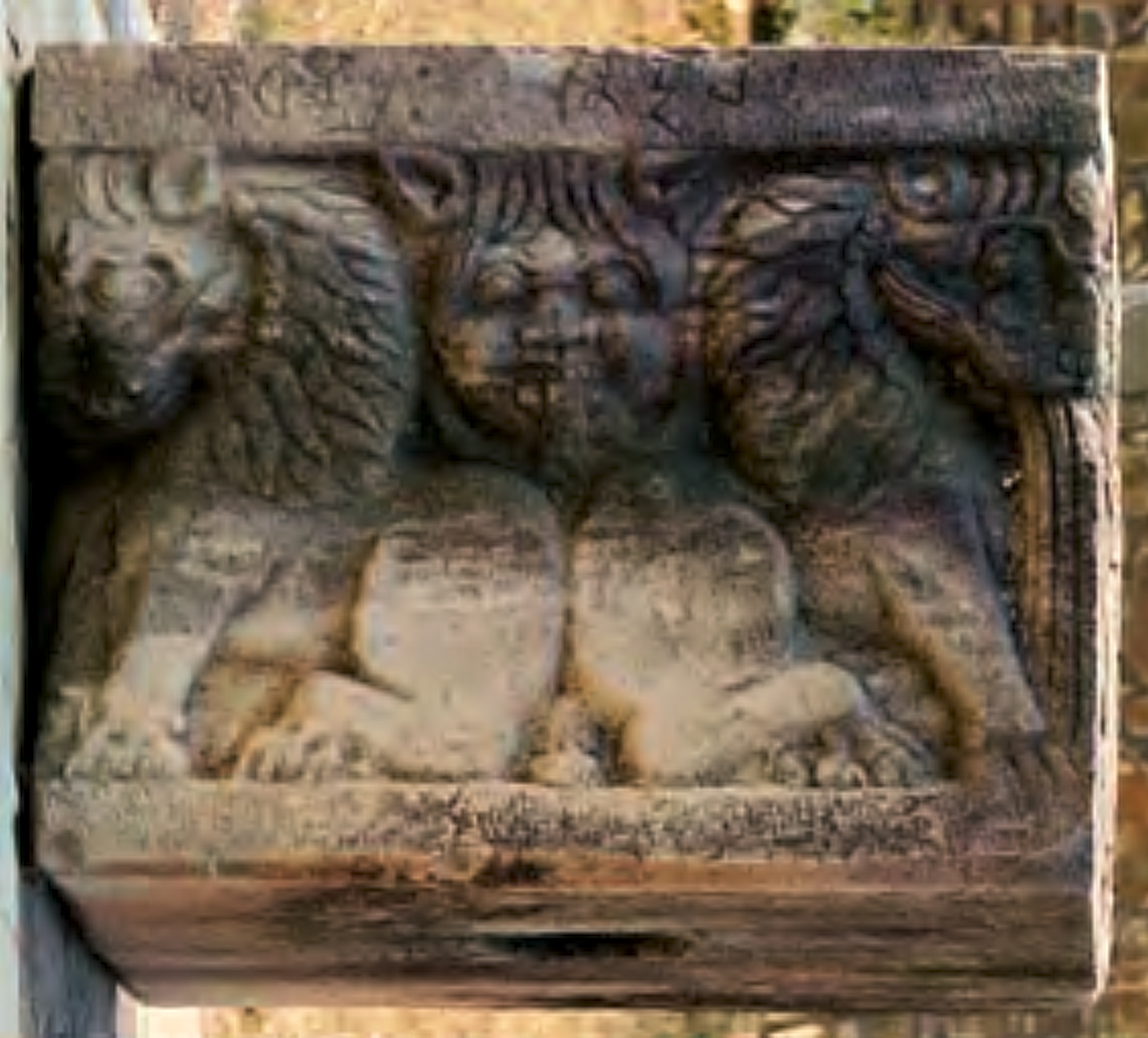
Sondhni pillar capital

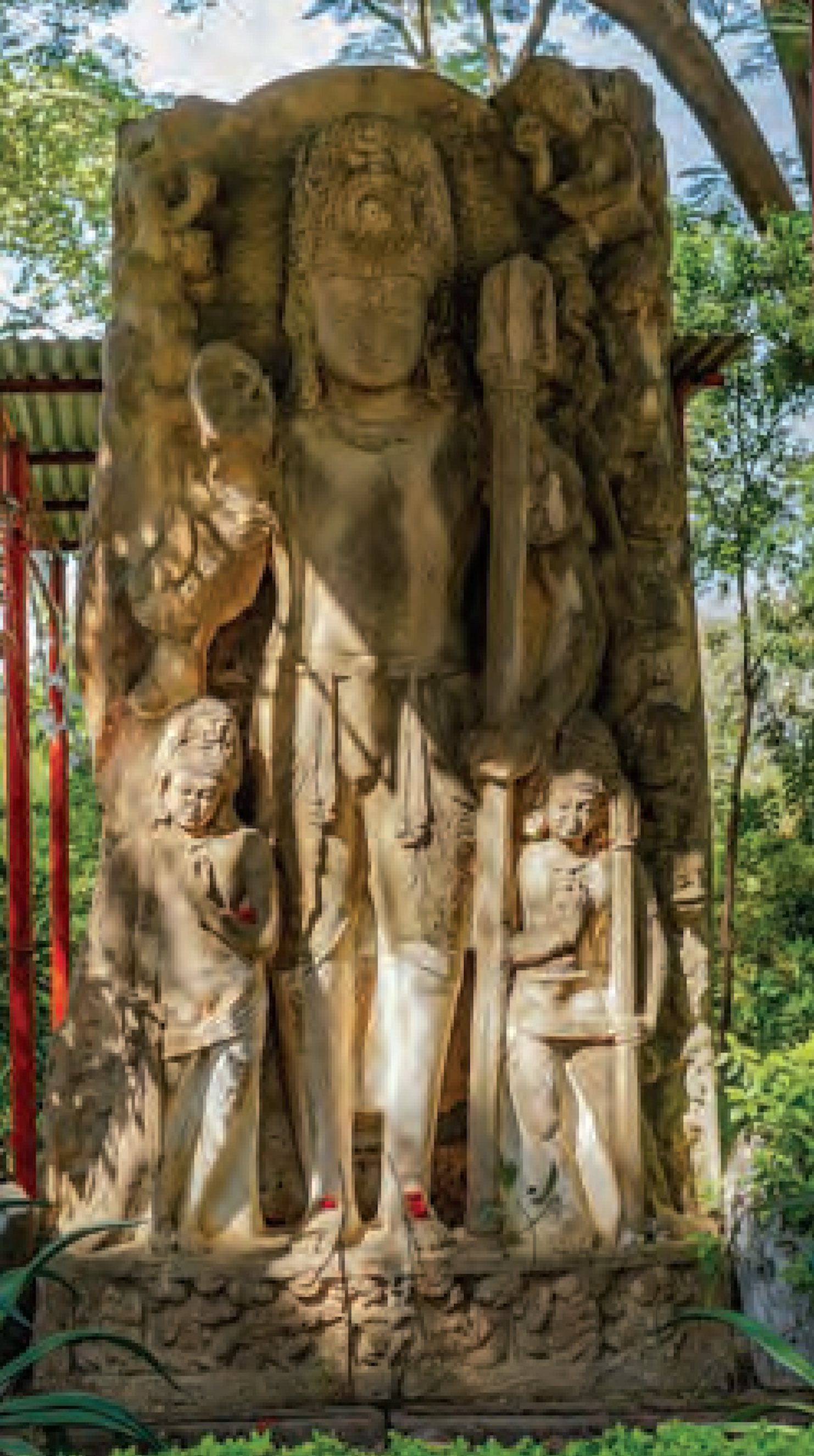
Prakasheshvara in Mandsaur Fort

== List of rulers ==
Find spots of the Aulikara inscriptions

The following Aulikara rulers are known from epigraphic evidence: (Note: The predecessors of Prakasha-dharman are known from his 515-516 CE Rīsthal inscription. The connection between Prakasha-dharman and Yashodharman is evident from the fact that Vasula, son of Kakka, composed the text of Prakasha-dharman's Risthal inscription as well as that of Yashodharman's undated Mandsor inscription. The stanzas of the inscriptions mentioning this fact are identical. Yashodharman ruled a few years after Prakasha-dharman, as attested by his 532 CE Mandsor inscription, and was probably his successor.)

- Senapati Drapa-vardhana; alternatively read as Druma-vardhana, and identified by some with king Dravya-vardhana mentioned by Varahamihira (see above)
- Jaya-vardhana
- Ajita-vardhana or Jita-vardhana (Note: K.V. Ramesh and S.P. Tiwari read the name as Ajita-vardhana. V.V. Mirashi reads it as Jita-vardhana. A.M. Shastri considers Ajita-vardhana as more likely to be correct.)
- Vibhishana-vardhana
- Rajya-vardhana
- Prakasha-dharman (fl. 515-516 CE) (Note: The Risthal inscription also calls Prakasha-dharman Bhagvat-prakasha, which V.V. Mirashi incorrectly believed to be the first ruler of the dynasty.)
- Yashodharman alias Vishnuvardhana (Note: The alternative name "Vishnu-vardhana" is absent in Yashodharman's own inscriptions. It is known only from an inscription of the family of his Rajasthaniya.)
- Possibly Maharajadhiraja Dravya-vardhana (see above)

== See also ==
- First Aulikara dynasty
- Yashodharman
- Malwa
- Battle of Sondani
- List of rulers of Malwa
- Shiladitya
