= Sondani =

Village in Madhya Pradesh, India

- Sondhni
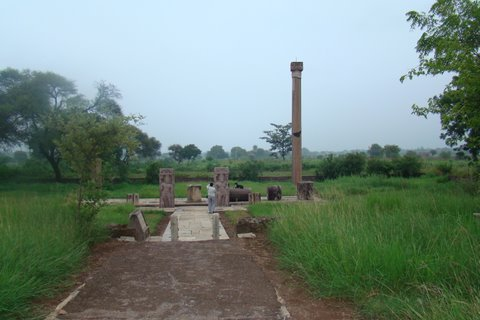
- Victory pillar of Yashodharman at Sondani, Mandsaur

- Location within India Location within Madhya Pradesh
- 24.0413°N 75.0918°E
- Type: Monuments

Sondani, also Sondhni, is a small village at a distance of about 4 km from Mandsaur situated on Mhow-Neemuch Highway towards Neemuch in Madhya Pradesh, India.

== Victory monuments (525 CE) ==
The spot is famous for a series of monuments with inscriptions, established by Yasodharman (ruled 515 – 545 CE), who praised himself for having defeated the Alchon Hun king Mihirakula.

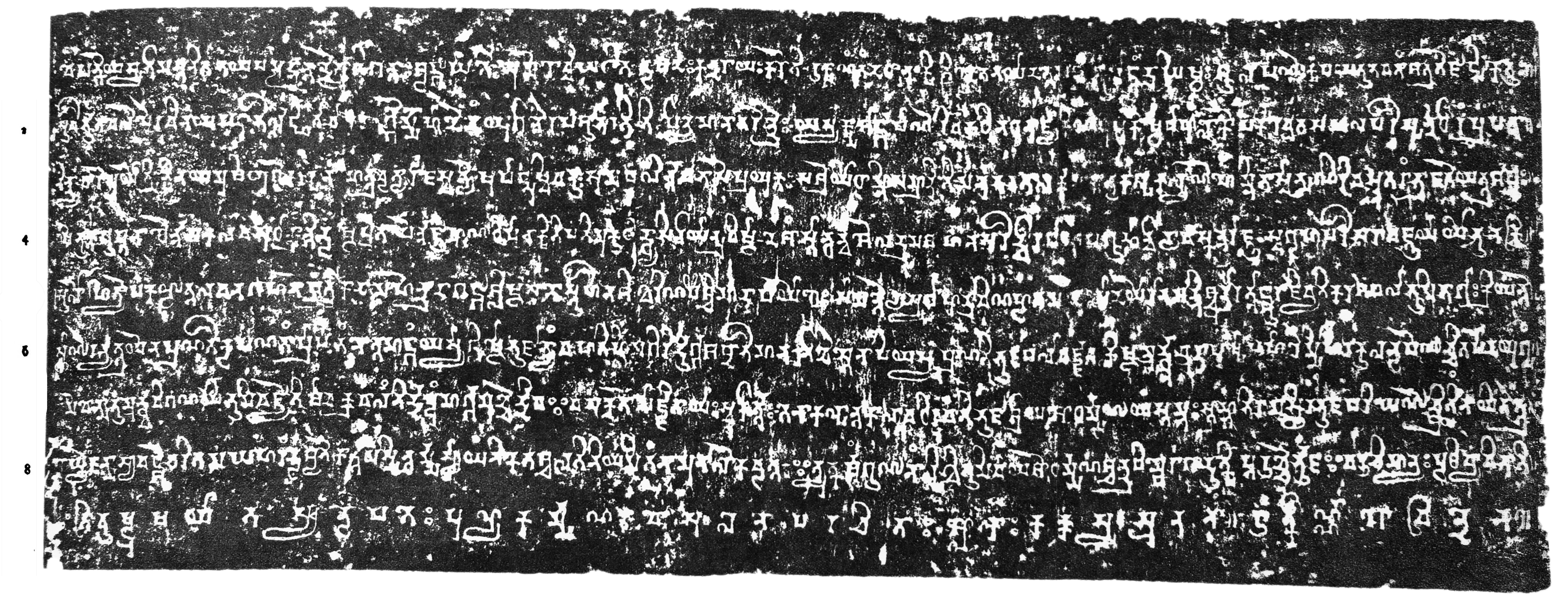
Mandasor stone pillar inscription of Yashodharman.

"He (Yasodharman) to whose two feet respect was paid, with complimentary presents of the flowers from the lock of hair on the top of (his) head, by even that (famous) king Mihirakula, whose forehead was pained through being bent low down by the strength of (his) arm in (the act of compelling) obeisance"

— Sondani pillar inscription.

The victory monuments consist in two pillars, with various other sculptural elements pointing to the existence of a former temple at this spot.

== Style ==
The art and style of the sculptural remains at Sodani are considered as a good marker of the final period of Gupta art, being dated to the reign of Yasodharman (ruled 515 – 545 CE), and more precisely to about 525 CE. After that point and for the next centuries, Indian politics became extremely fragmented, with the territory being divided between smaller dynasties. The art of Sondani is considered as transitional between Gupta art and the art of Medieval India: it represents "an aesthetic which hovered between the classical decorum of Gupta art on the one hand and on the other the medieval canons which subordinated the figure to the larger religious purpose". A buff sandstone doorframe fragment from Sondani, now in the National Museum, New Delhi, depicts a flying celestial couple and a smaller standing couple; it has been described as a Vidyadhara, Gandharva, or celestial mithuna-type motif.

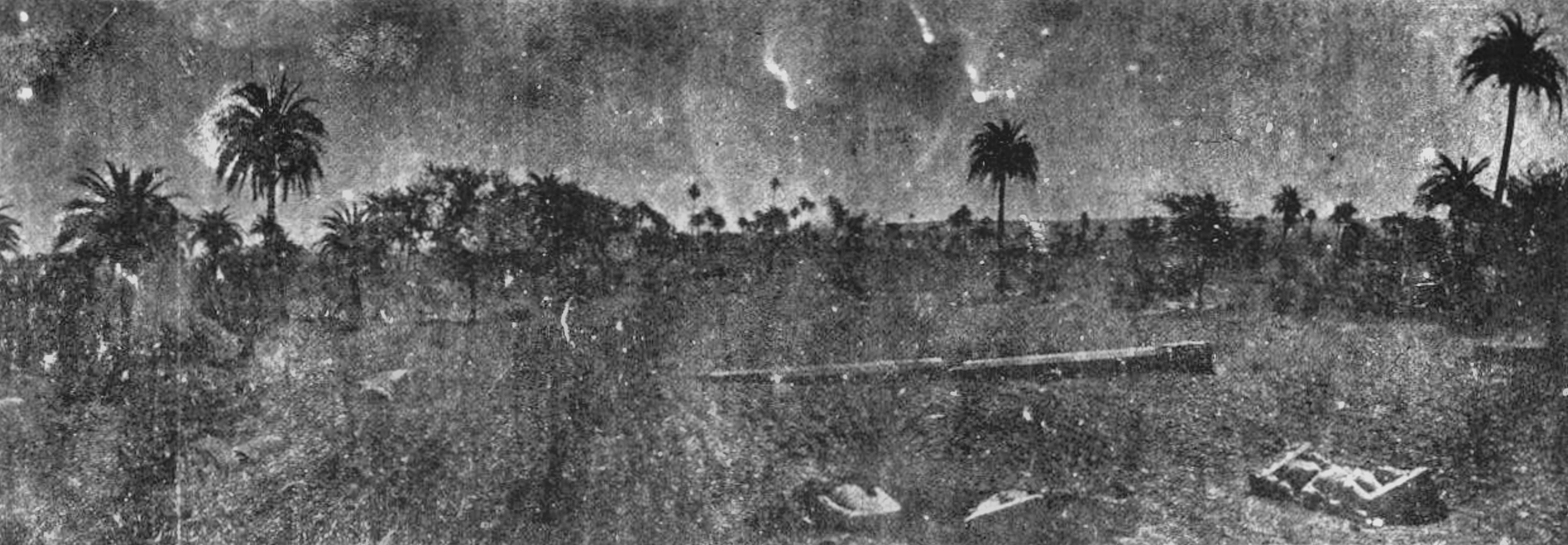
The Sondani site in 1908

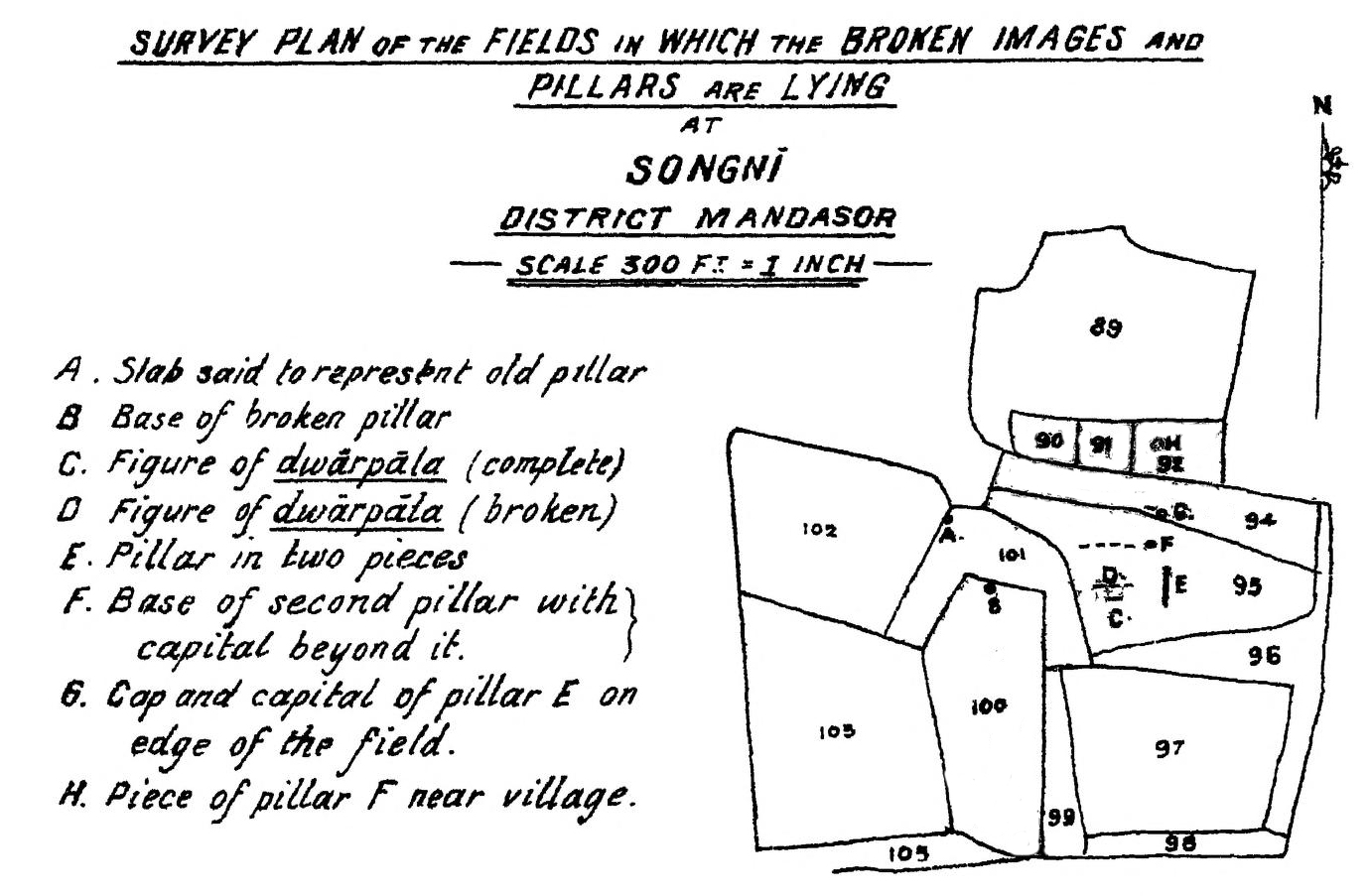
Plan of Sondani

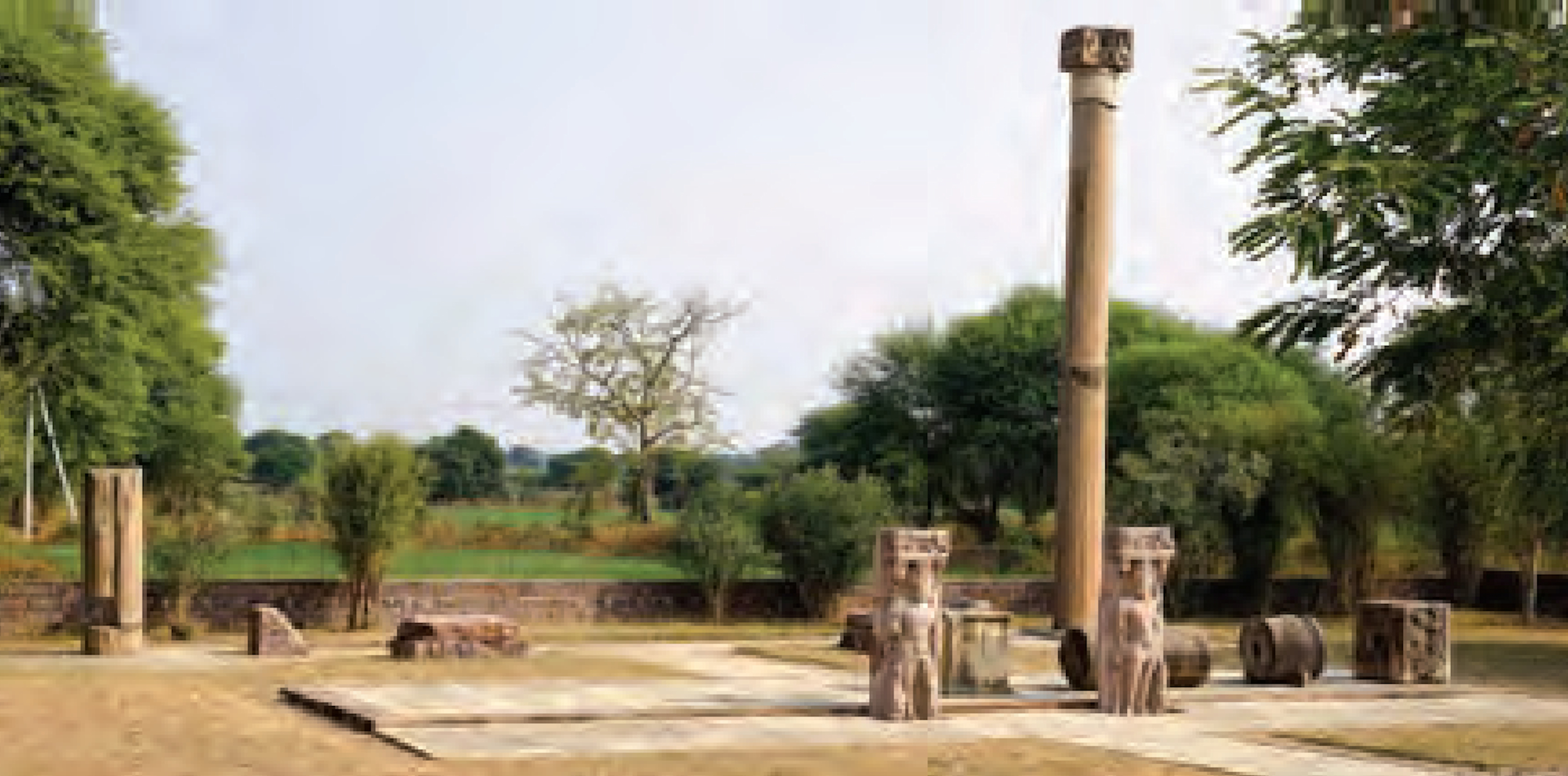
Sondani overview

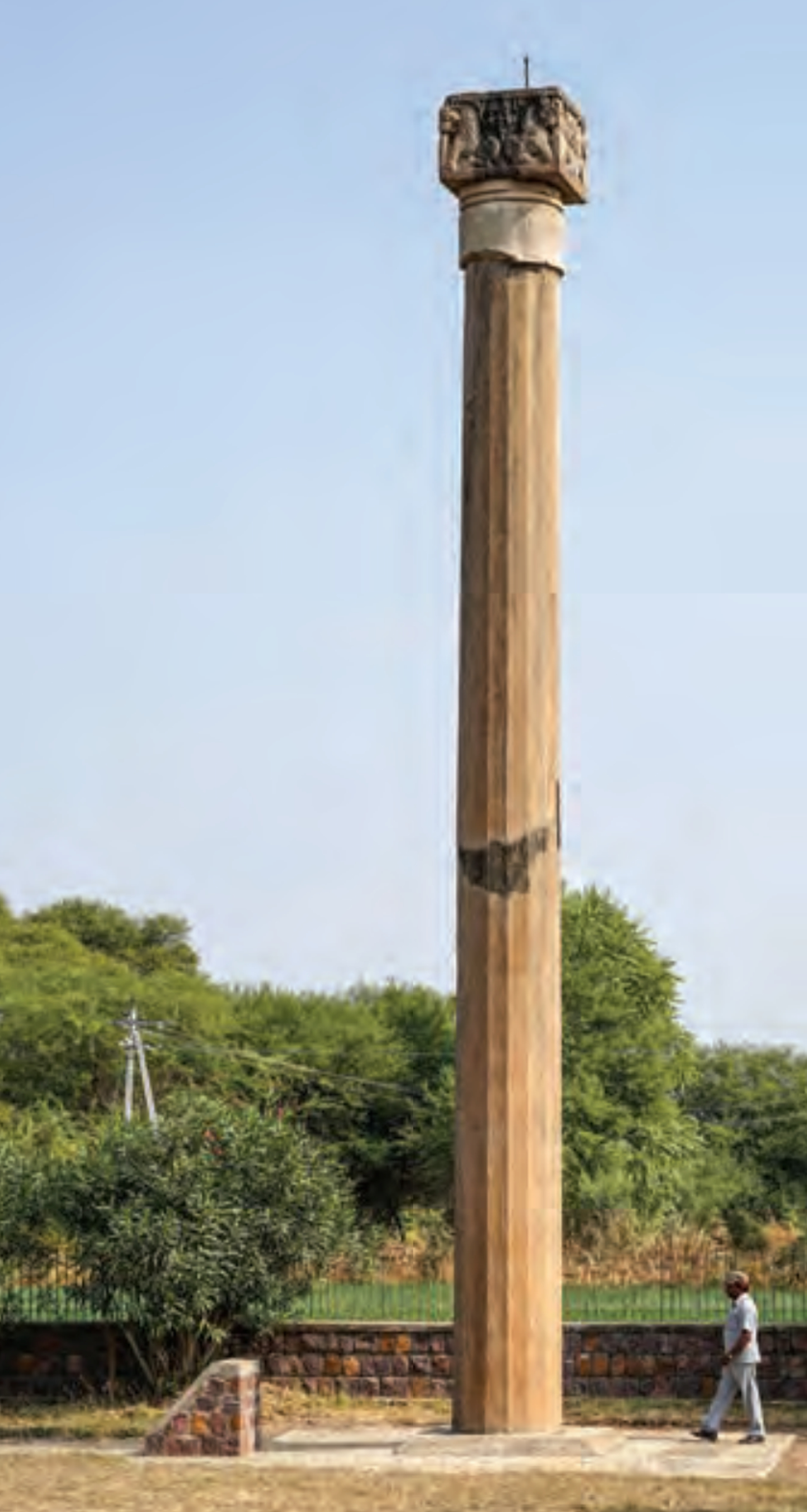
Sondani pillar

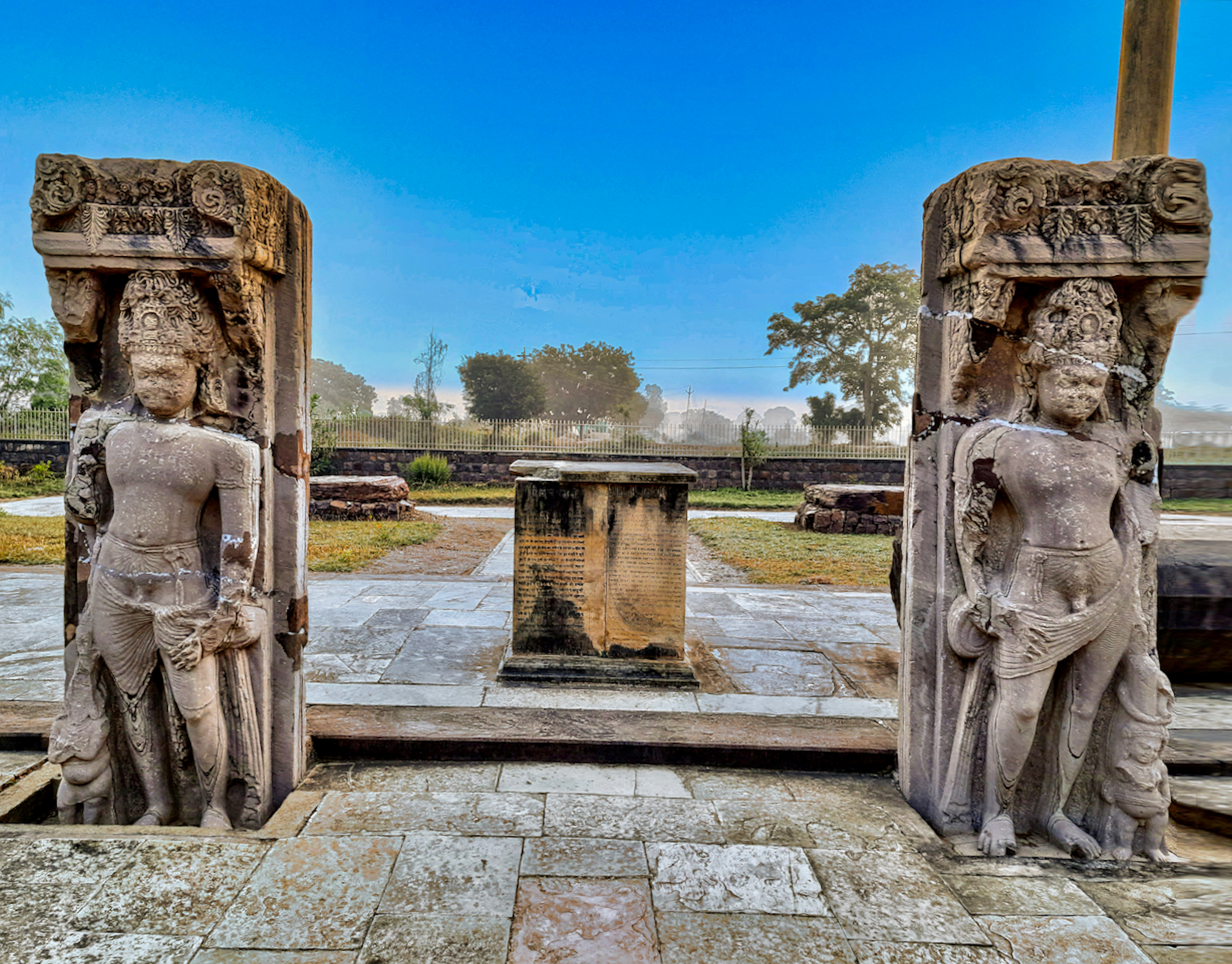
Sondani, two Dvarapalas

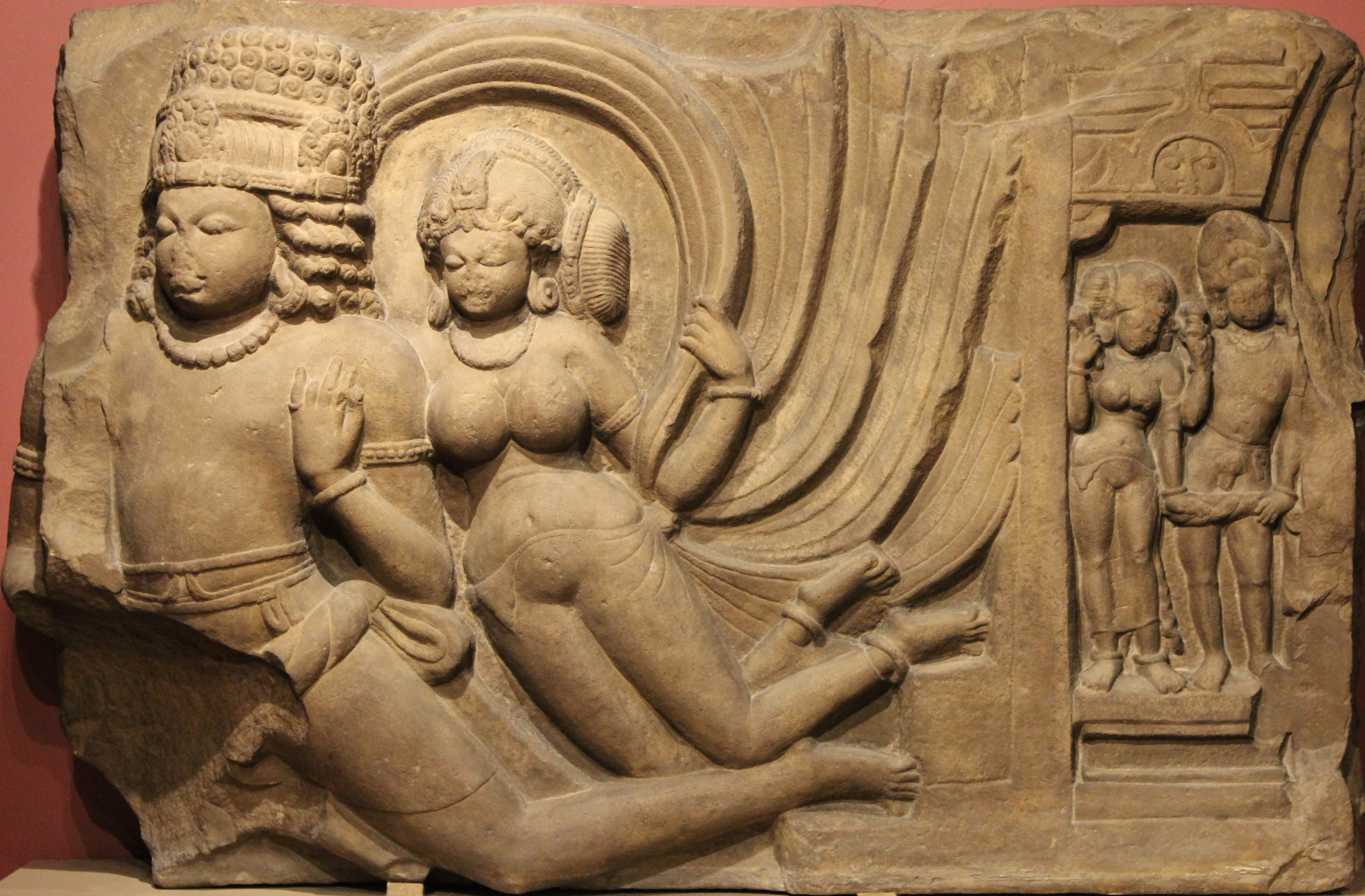
Vidyadhara, Sondani, circa 525 CE. National Museum, New Delhi

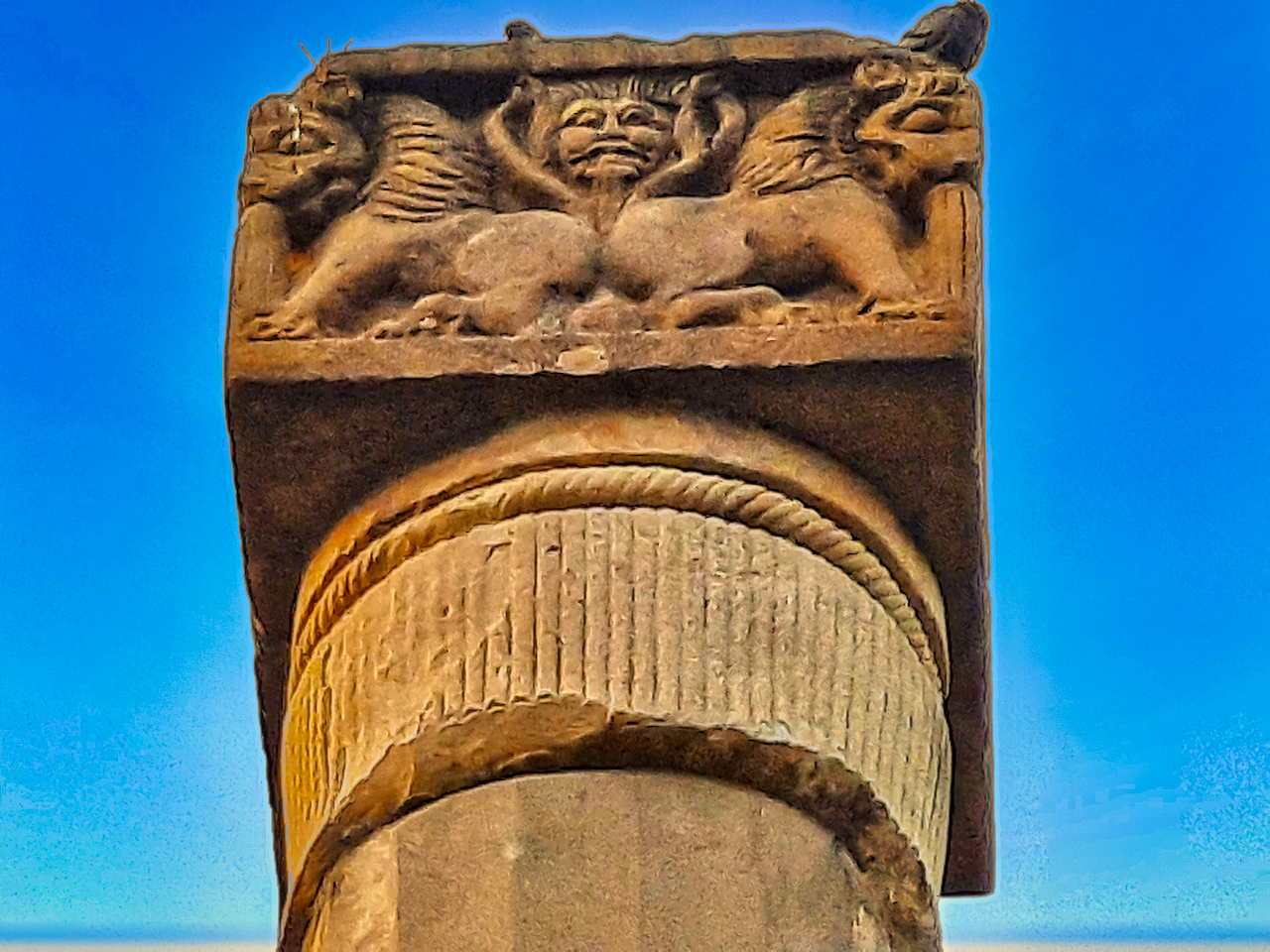
Sondani pillar capital

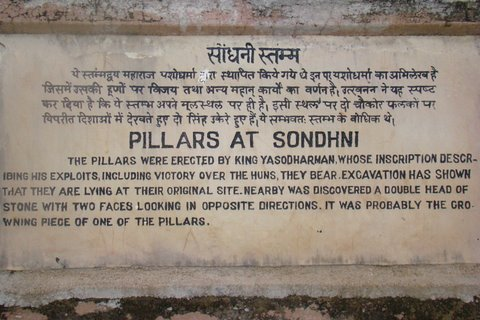
Info of Victory pillar of Yashodharman at Sondani, Mandsaur

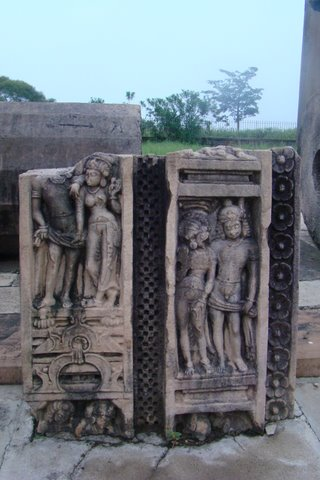
Sondani reliefs
