= Battle of the Oxus (399) =

399 battle between the Gupta Empire and the Hunas

- Part of First Gupta–Huna conflict (Note: "We can safely conclude not only that the Vahlikas of the Meharauli Inscription were the Oxus valley Hunas, but also that the first Gupta-Huna contact and conflict had taken place during the reign of Candragupta II. That is, the date of the first Gupta-Huna conflict should be fixed some forty years before the date of the so-called Huna invasion during the time of Skandagupta. In the light of this discussion, a reappraisal of the evidence of the Bhitari stone pillar inscription of Skandagupta on the Gupta-Huna conflict is likely to yield fruitful results.") and Gupta–Hunnic Wars
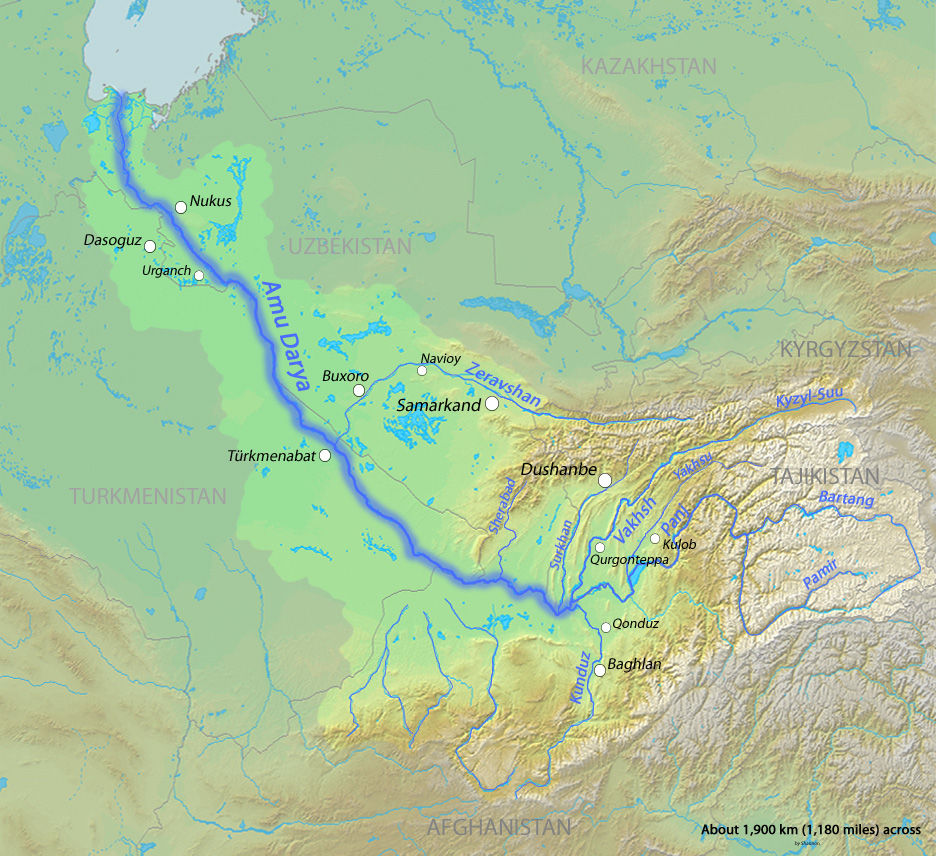
- Map of the Amu Darya's watershed in Central Asia, that drains parts of Afghanistan, Uzbekistan, Turkmenistan, and Tajikistan into the Aral Sea
Date	399
Location	Oxus river
Result	Gupta victory; Chandragupta II invades the Oxus valley
Territorial changes	Chandragupta II conquered the Oxus (Vankshu) and planted the Gupta flag on its banks

Belligerents
Gupta Empire	Hephthalites

Commanders and leaders
Chandragupta II	Unknown

Casualties and losses
Unknown	Unknown but high (Note: Kalidasa described Chandragupta II's military campaign against the Hunas and the grievous aftermath at the Oxus valley: "तत्र हूणावरोधानां भर्तृषु व्यक्तविक्रमम् । कपोलपाटनादेशि बभूव रघुचेष्टितम् ॥ The power of Raghu's (Chandragupta Vikramaditya's) exploits, resulting in the death of the Hūṇa chieftains, caused pricking of the cheeks of the womenfolk." —Raghuvaṃśa, IV, 68. (Note: "Let us now look more closely to verse 68 above, in which the poet gives evidence of his very intimate knowledge of the Hūṇas. In his time the Hūṇas were settled in the Oxus valley where a war was waged against them by an Indian emperor. We are told in the Mehrauli Inscription that an Indian king named Candra was the conqueror of the Bālhika region, and the probability is that he must have come into conflict with the Hūṇas settled to the east of Balkh. There is no other emperor except Candragupta Vikramāditya who could be the architect of such a grand exploit." "In the clash of arms against the Hūṇas, the latter suffered a grievous disaster and many of their heroes were slain in battle. The poet says: "The power of Raghu’s exploits, resulting in the death of Hūṇa chieftains, caused कपोलपाटन, i.e. pricking of the cheeks of their womenfolk." "It was a custom amongst the Hūṇas that the mourners pricked their cheeks with a knife so that blood and tears would flow mingling together. The Chinese accounts mention this fact and Stanislas Julien had collected this evidence, in his paper Documents Historiques sur les Tou-kioue (Turks) published in Journal Asiatique, 1844, pp. 325-367. On p. 352 it is specifically mentioned: Ils font le tour de la tente en poussant des cris lugubres, et, avec un couteau, se tailladent le visage, où l’on voit couler à la fois le sang et les larmes. (Transl. ‘It is said that they go round their tents making doleful lamentations, and prick their faces with a knife so that one sees blood flowing with the tears.’) Perhaps both men and women gave vent to their grief in this manner. Kālidāsa naturally enough mentions only the womenfolk mourning in this manner for their husbands slain on the battlefield." "This meaning is possible only if the original reading of the verse was कपोलपाटनादेशि as had been suggested by Prof. K. B. Pathak. Again we may say that Mallinātha has substituted a wrong reading for one of the most brilliant poetic expressions of Kālidāsa. चारित्रवधेन and सुमतिविजय have referred in the clearest terms to the custom that the Hūṇa women caught in the intensity of grief followed their lamentations with cuts in their breasts and cheeks (द्वयोर्धितः कुचकपोलविदारणपूर्वं ). Vallabhadeva, the oldest available commentator of the Raghuvaṁśa had found the reading कपोलपाटनादेशि which he explains: कपोलपाटनमादिशतीति पतिवधादू भार्या रुद्यः कुचकपोलं नखैर्विदारयन्ति । Another commentator named Udayākara in his commentary रघुवंश प्रकाशिका retains the older reading meaning : कपोलपाटनादेशि—कपोलयोः पाटनं नखैर्विदारणम् आदिशति कथयति यत्तत् कपोलपाटनादेशि ।" "Let us examine the testimony of Mss. In the critical edition of Nandargikar Mss. C. D. E. H. I. R. with the commentaries of Cāritravardhana, Vallabhadeva, Sumativijaya and Dharmameru, the reading is•पाटनादेश, and not•पाटलादेश. The editor unfortunately accepted Mallinātha’s reading and ignored the testimony of his best Mss. and older commentators about the reading •पाटनादेश." "Mallinātha has foisted a grammatically incorrect reading on Kālidāsa. He explains कपोलपाटलादेशि as कपोलेषु पाटलस्य पाटलिमस्ताडनादिक्ताकृग्यस्यादेशि उपदेशकम्, i. e. पाटल means पाटलिमा or ruddiness produced in the cheeks of the Hūṇa women who slapped their faces red in grief. पाटल is an adjectival form which has to be understood as substantive पाटलिमा. Dr. Buddha Prakash had informed me of the Hūṇa funeral custom about pricking the cheeks. Dr. Raghavan suggested that if पाटन could be found to be the original reading, the linguistic difficulty would be obviated. The reading •पाटनादेशि is perfect not only grammatically, but also in the light of the new historical information about the Hūṇas gleaned from the Chinese sources.")) (Note: Kalidasa describes the gloomy aftermath of the Hunnic defeat in the Oxus valley when the Hunnic women scarred their faces as was the ancient custom of cutting the faces of the wives of deceased warriors in battle. To quote the poet: "...There (in the Vanskhu valley)... the power (of the exploits of the Indian emperor) of which was clearly seen in (the slaughter of) the husbands of the young (Huna) women (when) in the inner apartments of the camps of the Huna Kings, (these exploits of the Indian army) proved a teacher of ruddiness in their cheeks (which were self-scarred following their Huna culture)...")

The Battle of the Oxus occurred in 399, when Chandragupta II defeated the Hunas at the banks of the Oxus river. (Note: "We get some informations about the Hūṇas from Kālidāsa, who in his Raghuvaṃśa places them on the banks of the river Oxus where they were defeated by Raghu. Taking Kālidāsa to be a contemporary of Chandragupta II, we can conclude that the Hūṇas had occupied Bactria in the last quarter of the fourth century AD.") (Note: "In a well-contested battle, Candragupta had defeated them. That battle had taken place somewhere in southern Afghanistan. He had pushed them towards the Persian border. His success against them had inspired him to invade the Oxus valley Hunas. Once he took that decision, he adopted the northern route and descended on the Oxus valley. Since the Hunas had done nothing which could make the Indian ruler hostile towards them, they did not expect any invasion from the south. They were taken by surprise. And before they could recover from the initial shock, they were defeated by the Indian army.")

== Background ==
=== Submission of Varahran ===
After the (Persian) Sasanians faced defeat in the Battle of Sistan, which demoralized the Persian contingents in present-day Afghanistan. As the Gupta Army marched northwards to Kapisa, Varahran was quick to grasp the political realities and offered his submission to the Gupta Emperor, Chandragupta II.

== Battle ==
=== Gupta cavalry's arrival by the Oxus river ===
Bactria was under the Huna occupation in the last quarter of the fourth century AD. The sudden attack into the Oxus valley caught the Transoxiana alliance off-guard. The Pamir Tocharians were unable to combine with the Hunas (Hephthalites). On hearing the news of the Gupta Empire advance, the Hephtalites resorted to a tactical retreat to the north of the Oxus River into the plains of Southern Uzbekistan. When the Gupta cavalry arrived by the Oxus river on the southern banks, they camped there. Kalidasa poetically described how the cavalry camped on the banks of the river Vankshu in the midst of saffron fields in a verse of his Raghuvamsa:

"...His horses, that had lessened their fatigues of the road by turning from side to side on the banks of the river Vankshu (Oxus), shook their shoulders to which were clung the filaments of saffron..."

Historians studied this as a description of the Gupta cavalry camping on the banks of the Oxus during Chandragupta II's expedition.
