= Aulikaras =

Ancient Malava clan (350–575)

House of Aulikara
- Country: Kingdom of Malwa
- Founded: 350
- Founder: Jayavarman
- Final ruler: Yashodharman
- Seat: Mandsaur
- Titles: Maharaja of Malwa; Adhiraja of Malwa; Rajadhiraja of Malwa
- Dissolution: 545
- Branches: First Aulikara dynasty; Second Aulikara dynasty

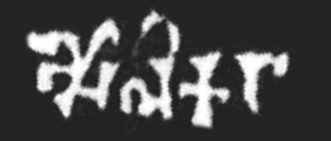
The word "Aulikara" (Late Brahmi script: Au-li-ka-rā) in the Risthal inscription. The first letter Au is a variation in a style specific to the 6-7th century.

The Aulikaras (Late Brahmi script: Au-li-ka-rā), were an ancient clan that ruled the Kingdom of Malwa between 350 and 575.

Epigraphical discoveries have brought to light two royal lines, who call themselves as the Aulikaras and ruled from Dashapura (present-day Mandsaur). The first royal house, which ruled from Dashapura comprised the following kings in the order of succession: Jayavarma, Simhavarma, Naravarma, Vishvavarma and Bandhuvarma. The Rīsthal stone slab inscription discovered in 1983 has brought to light another royal house, which comprised the following kings in the order of succession: Drumavardhana, Jayavardhana, Ajitavardhana, Vibhishanavardhana, Rajyavardhana and Prakashadharma, who defeated Toramana. In all probability, Yashodharman also belonged to this house and he was the son and successor of Prakashadharma. Yashodharma defeated Mihirakula and freed the Malwa region from the Hunas. The rule of the Aulikaras over Malwa ended with him.

== Origin ==
Nothing is mentioned about the origin of the Aulikaras or the Olikaras (as mentioned in the Bihar Kotra inscription of Naravarma) in their inscriptions. Based on the fact that, they used the Malava Samvat in preference to the use of Gupta era in all of their inscriptions in spite of their first royal house being a feudatory of the Guptas, historian D. C. Sircar assumed them as a clan of the Malavas. This clan settled in the Dasheraka region (present-day western Malwa) in the course of their migration from the Punjab. His view was supported by K.K. Dasgupta and K.C. Jain.

== First Aulikara dynasty ==
Find spots of the inscriptions issued by the first Aulikara dynasty

Earliest information regarding the first royal house is known from two inscriptions of Naravarma, the Mandsaur inscription dated Malava Samvat 461 (404 CE) and the Bihar Kotra inscription (in modern-day Rajgarh district, Madhya Pradesh) dated Malava Samvat 474 (417 CE). The founder of this house is Jayavarma. He was succeeded by his son, Simhavarma, who is mentioned as a Kshitisha (king). His son and successor Naravarma is mentioned as a Parthiva (king) and Maharaja. His epithet was Simhavikrantagami (one who moves with the stride of a lion).

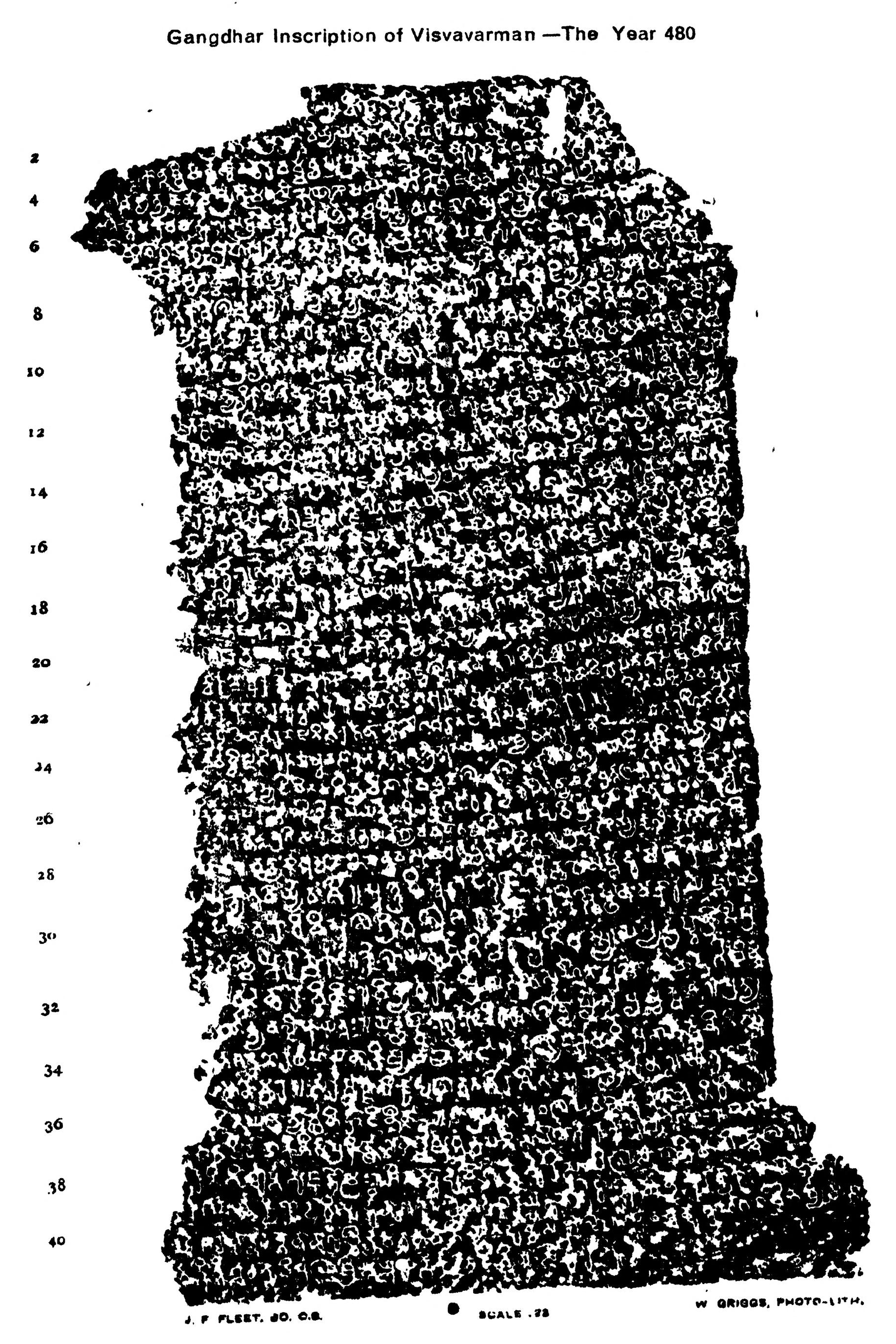
Gangadhar Stone Inscription of Viśvavarman.

Naravarma was succeeded by his son Vishvavarma, who is mentioned in the Gangadhar Stone Inscription of Viśvavarman dated Malava Samvat 480 (423 CE). The Gangadhara stone inscription records construction of a Matrika temple by his minister Mayurakshaka. Mayurakshaka also constructed a temple dedicated to Vishnu. Vishvavarma was succeeded by his son Bandhuvarma, who is eulogised by poet Vatsabhatti in the Mandsaur stone inscription of the guild of silk-weavers dated Malava Samvat 529 (473 CE). This inscription informs us that he was a feudatory of the Gupta emperor Kumaragupta I. It was during his reign, a temple dedicated to Surya was constructed by the guild of silk-weavers at Dashapura in the Malava Samvat 493 (436 CE). This temple was renovated in 473 by the same guild.

== The intermediate period ==
The history of Dashapura remained obscure after Bandhuvarma. The Mandsaur inscription dated Malava Samvat 524 (467 CE), written by Ravila mentions a king of Dashapura named Prabhakara, who defeated the enemies of the Guptas. Dattabhata was the commander of his army, whose donations to the Lokottara Vihara is recorded in this inscription. Soon after Prabhakara, another Aulikara royal house came to power, about which we came to know from the Risthal inscription. The exact relationship between these two royal houses is not certain.

== Second Aulikara dynasty ==
A stone slab inscription discovered in 1983 in Risthal near Sitamau, has brought to light another royal house belonging to the Aulikara family. This inscription dated Malava Samvat 572 (515 CE) is written by poet Vasula, son of Kakka in chaste Sanskrit. The script used is the late Gupta Brahmi paleographically assignable to the 5th-6th centuries. Unlike the earlier royal house, this royal house was never a Gupta feudatory. The Risthal inscription mentions Drumavardhana as the founder of this house. He assumed the title, Senapati. He was succeeded by his son Jayavardhana, who commanded a formidable army. He was succeeded by his son Ajitavardhana. According to the Risthal inscription, he was constantly engaged in performing Soma sacrifices. Ajitavardhana was succeeded by his son Vibhishanavardhana. He was praised in the Risthal inscription for his noble qualities. Vibhishanavardhana's son and successor Rajyavardhana expanded his ancestral kingdom. Rajyavardhana was succeeded by his son Prakashadharma.

=== Prakashadharma ===
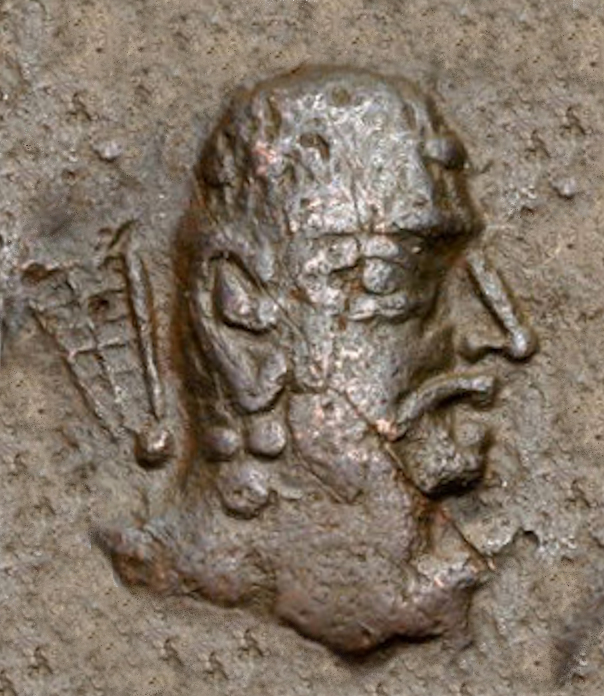
According to the Rīsthal inscription, Alchon Huns ruler Toramana (depicted) was vanquished by Prakashadharma in 515 CE.

Prakashadharma was a notable king of this dynasty, who assumed the title, Adhiraja. The Rīsthal inscription gives us information about his achievements. It records the construction of a tank and a Shiva temple at Risthal by Bhagavaddosha, a Rajasthaniya (viceroy) of Prakashadharma. This inscription mentions that Prakashadharma defeated the Huna ruler Toramana, sacked his camp and had taken away the ladies of his harem. The tank constructed at Risthal during his reign was named after his grandfather as Vibhishanasara. He also constructed a temple dedicated to Brahma at Dashapura. During the excavation at Mandsaur in 1978 by a team of Vikram University, Ujjain, led by V.S. Wakankar, his two glass seals inscribed with the legend Shri Prakashadharma were found. In all probabilities he was succeeded by his son Yashodharma Vishnuvarma.

An undated fragmentary Mandsaur inscription provides a name of a suzerain ruler Adityavardhana and his feudatory Maharaja Gauri. Adityavardhana has been recently identified with Prakashadharma by a historian Ashvini Agarwal. The Chhoti Sadri inscription dated Malava Samvat 547 (490 CE) and written by Bhramarasoma, son of Mitrasoma supplies a genealogy of Adityavardhana's feudatory ruler, Maharaja Gauri. The first ruler of this Manavayani kshatriya family was Punyasoma. He was succeeded by his son Rajyavardhana. Rashtravardhana was the son of Rajyavardhana. Rashtravardhana's son and successor was Yashogupta. The last ruler of this family, Gauri was son of Yashogupta. He excavated a tank at Dashapura for the merit of his deceased mother. This inscription also mentions the name of a prince, Gobhata but his relationship with Gauri is not known.

=== Yashodharma ===
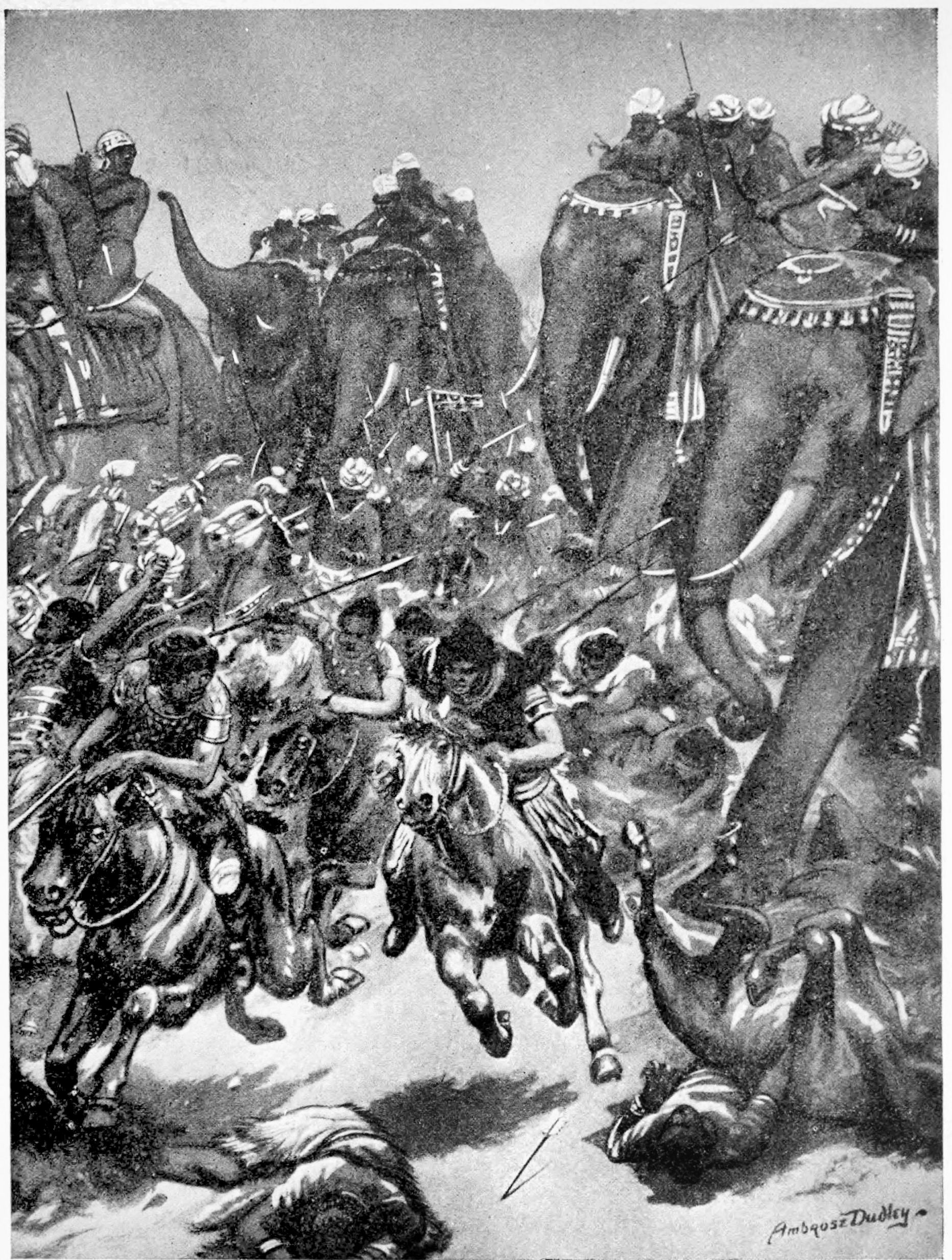
The defeat of the Alchon Huns under Mihirakula by King Yashodharma at Sondani in 528 CE.

The most prominent king of this dynasty was Yashodharma Vishnuvardhana. Yashodharma's two identical undated Mandsaur victory pillar inscriptions (found at Sondani, near present-day Mandsaur town) and a stone inscription dated Malava Samvat 589 (532 CE) record the military achievements of him. All of these inscriptions were first published by John Faithfull Fleet in 1886. The undated pillar inscriptions, which were also written by poet Vasula, son of Kakka say that his feet were worshipped by the Huna ruler Mihirakula. These also state that his feudatories from the vicinity of the river Lauhitya (Brahmaputra) in the east, from the Mahendra mountains (Eastern Ghats) in the south, up to the Himalayas in the north and the Paschima Payodhi (Arabian Sea) in the west came to the seat of his empire to pay homage. he assumed the titles, Rajadhiraja and Parameshvara. Yashodharma's dated inscription informs us that in 532 CE, Nirdosha, his Rajasthaniya was governing the area between the Vindhyas and the Pariyatras (Aravalis) and his headquarters was Dashapura. Probably the rule of the Aulikaras ended with Yashodhrma

In Line 5 of the Mandsaur pillar inscription, Yashodharman is said to have vanquished his enemies and to now control the territory from the neighbourhood of the (river) Lauhitya (Brahmaputra River) to the "Western Ocean" (Western Indian Ocean), and from the Himalayas to mountain Mahendra.

Yashodharman thus conquered vast territories from the Hunas and the Guptas, although his short-lived empire would ultimately disintegrate between 530 and 540 CE.

== Successors of the Aulikaras ==
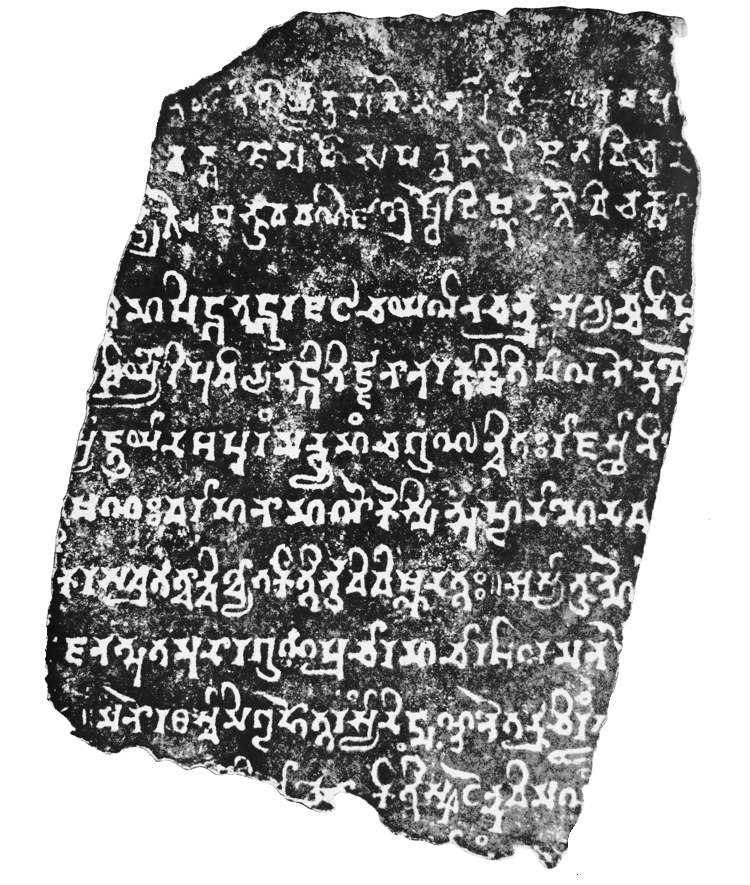
Chittorgarh Fort fragmentary inscriptions of the Naigamas, first half of the 6th century CE.

A fragmentary undated inscription of a hitherto unknown ruler Kumaravarma was found by Girija Shankar Runwal during Mandsaur excavation by the team of Vikram University, Ujjain in 1979 from the foundations of a building. This inscription, paleographically assignable to the late 5th-early 6th centuries, records a dynasty comprising four successive rulers: Yajnadeva, Virasoma, his son Bhaskaravarma and his son Kumaravarma. Wakankar claimed them as the Aulikaras and V.V. Mirashi claimed this dynasty a separate one, which defeated and succeeded the Aulikaras. But none of these theories received support from other historians. Most probably the Kalachuris succeeded the Aulikaras, as the Kalchuri kings Krishnaraja and his son Shankaragana are found ruling over the same region immediately after the Aulikaras. The Maitrakas too may have been successors of the Aulikaras.

== List of rulers ==
Rulers of First Aulikara dynasty-

- Jayavarma
- Simhavarma
- Naravarma
- Vishvavarma
- Bandhuvarma

Rulers of Second Aulikara dynasty-

- Drumavardhana
- Jayavardhana
- Ajitavardhana
- Vibhishanavardhana
- Rajyavardhana
- Prakashadharma
- Yashodharman

== See also ==
- Mandsaur
- Malwa
- Aulikara Empire
- List of rulers of Malwa
