= Malavas =

Ancient Indian tribe

Malavas Mālava-deśa or Mālava-gaṇa
- c. 4th century BCE–c. 7th century CE
- Location on the Malavas and contemporary South Asian polities circa 150 BCE.
- Religion: Historical Vedic religion Jainism; Buddhism; Ajivikism
- Government: Aristocratic republic
- History
  - Established: c. 4th century BCE
  - Disestablished: c. 7th century CE
Preceded by
Avanti (Ancient India)
Western Satraps
Succeeded by
Chalukyas
Kingdom of Valabhi
Gurjara Confederacy
- Today part of: India

The Malavas (Brahmi script: 𑀫𑁆𑀫𑀸𑀭𑀯 Mālava) or Malwas were an ancient Indian tribe and confederation. They are a federation attested in various states in North and Central India. The modern regions of Malwa (Punjab) and Malwa region in Madhya Pradesh and Rajasthan are eponyms attributed to them. Their power gradually declined as a result of defeats against the Western Satraps (2nd century CE), the Gupta emperor Samudragupta (4th century), and the Chalukya emperor Pulakeshin II (7th century).

The Malava era, which later came to be known as Vikram Samvat, may have been first used by them.

== Vedic Era ==
The Malavas are a tribe mentioned in several ancient Indian texts, including the Mahabharata and Mahabhashya. According to the Mahabharata, the hundred sons of the Madra kekaya king Ashvapati, the father of Savitri were known as the Malavas, after the name of their mother, Malavi.

They are later regarded as a Gana which functions as a republic or confederation. Panini mentions a group of tribes called ayudhajivi samghas (those who live by the profession of arms) including the Malavas and the Kshudrakas his sutra V.3.117. The Malavas are also mentioned in the Mahabhashya (IV.1.68) by Patanjali. Patanjali states that the serfs and slaves of the Malava Gana were not to be considered Malavya, a term only applied to children of tribesmen with full rights.

== Macedonian Empire ==
The location of the original homeland of the Malavas is not certain, but modern scholars generally connect them with the "Malli" or "Malloi" mentioned in the ancient Greek accounts, which describe Alexander's war against them. At the time of Alexander's invasion in the 4th century BCE, the Malloi lived in present-day Punjab region, in the area to the north of the confluence of the Ravi and the Chenab rivers.

== Territorial Extent ==
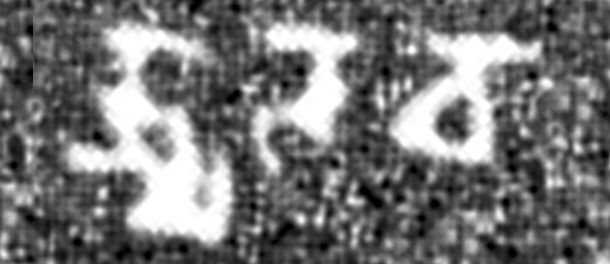
The name "Malava" (Brahmi script: 𑀫𑁆𑀫𑀸𑀭𑀯 Mmālava) in the Allahabad Pillar inscription of Samudragupta (350-375 CE).

The Malavas extent and timeline is not fully elucidate. During the time of their conflicts with Alexander, they were attested in Punjab, however their presence in other regions at that time is not known. Furthermore, there are no literary or epigraphical mention of the Malavas during the Maurya Empire. The Malava gana resurfaced again three centuries later when they began to issues thousands of coins in Uniara in Tonk district near Jaipur, which likely represented Malavanagara (present-day Nagar Fort) their historical capital. These coins bear the legend Malavanam jayah (lit. 'victory of the Malavas'), and have been dated between 250 BCE and 250 CE during the Saka Era. Several inscriptions dated in the Malava era have been found in various parts of Rajasthan, which suggests that the Malava influence extended to a wider part of Rajasthan. It is unknown if they claimed the region prior or relocated here following their conflicts with entities such as Macedonians, Mauryans, Indo-Greek, or Indo-Scythians during their occupation of Punjab. Following their resurgence in Malavanagar, the Malavas ultimately claimed the Malwa region in central India: this region was named after them some time after the 2nd century CE. Some historians attribute the Malavas, originally residing in the Punjab region, migrating to Central India/Rajasthan due to the Huna invasion.

=== Conflict against the Western Satraps ===
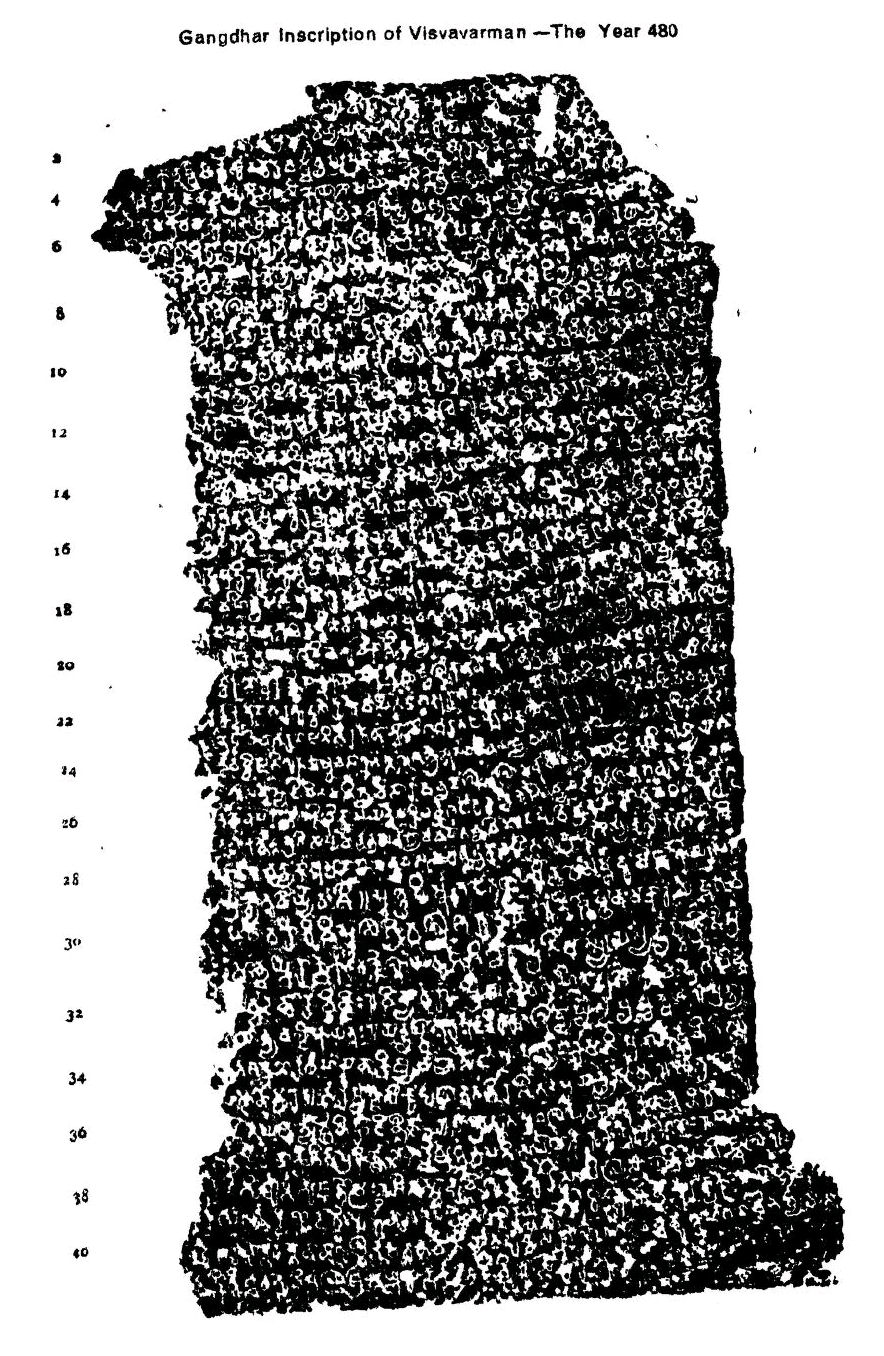
Gangadhar Stone Inscription of Viśvavarman, king of the Aulikaras, a branch of the Malavas, and contemporary of Kumaragupta, 423 CE.

Around 120 CE, the Malavas are mentioned as besieging the king of the Uttamabhadras to the south, but the Uttamabhadras were finally rescued by the Western Satraps, and the Malvas were crushed. The account appears in an inscription at the Nashik Caves, made by Nahapana's viceroy Ushavadata:

... And by order of the Lord I went to release the chief of the Uttamabhadras, who had been besieged for the rainy season by the Malayas, and those Malayas fled at the mere roar (of my approaching) as it were, and were all made prisoners of the Uttamabhadra warriors.

— Inscription in Cave No.10 of the Nashik Caves.

=== Conflict with the Guptas ===
In the 4th century CE, during the reign of the Gupta emperor Samudragupta, the Malavas most probably lived in Rajasthan and western Malwa. The Allahabad Pillar inscription of Samudragupta names the Malavas among the tribes subjugated by him:

(Lines 22–23) (Samudragupta, whose) formidable rule was propitiated with the payment of all tributes, execution of orders and visits (to his court) for obeisance by such frontier rulers as those of Samataṭa, Ḍavāka, Kāmarūpa, Nēpāla, and Kartṛipura, and, by the Mālavas, Ārjunāyanas, Yaudhēyas, Mādrakas, Ābhīras, Prārjunas, Sanakānīkas, Kākas, Kharaparikas and other (tribes)."

— Lines 22–23 of the Allahabad pillar inscription of Samudragupta (r.c.350-375 CE).

The Aulikaras who ruled in the Malwa region may have been a Malava clan, and may have been responsible for the name "Malwa" being applied to the region.

== Post-Gupta period ==
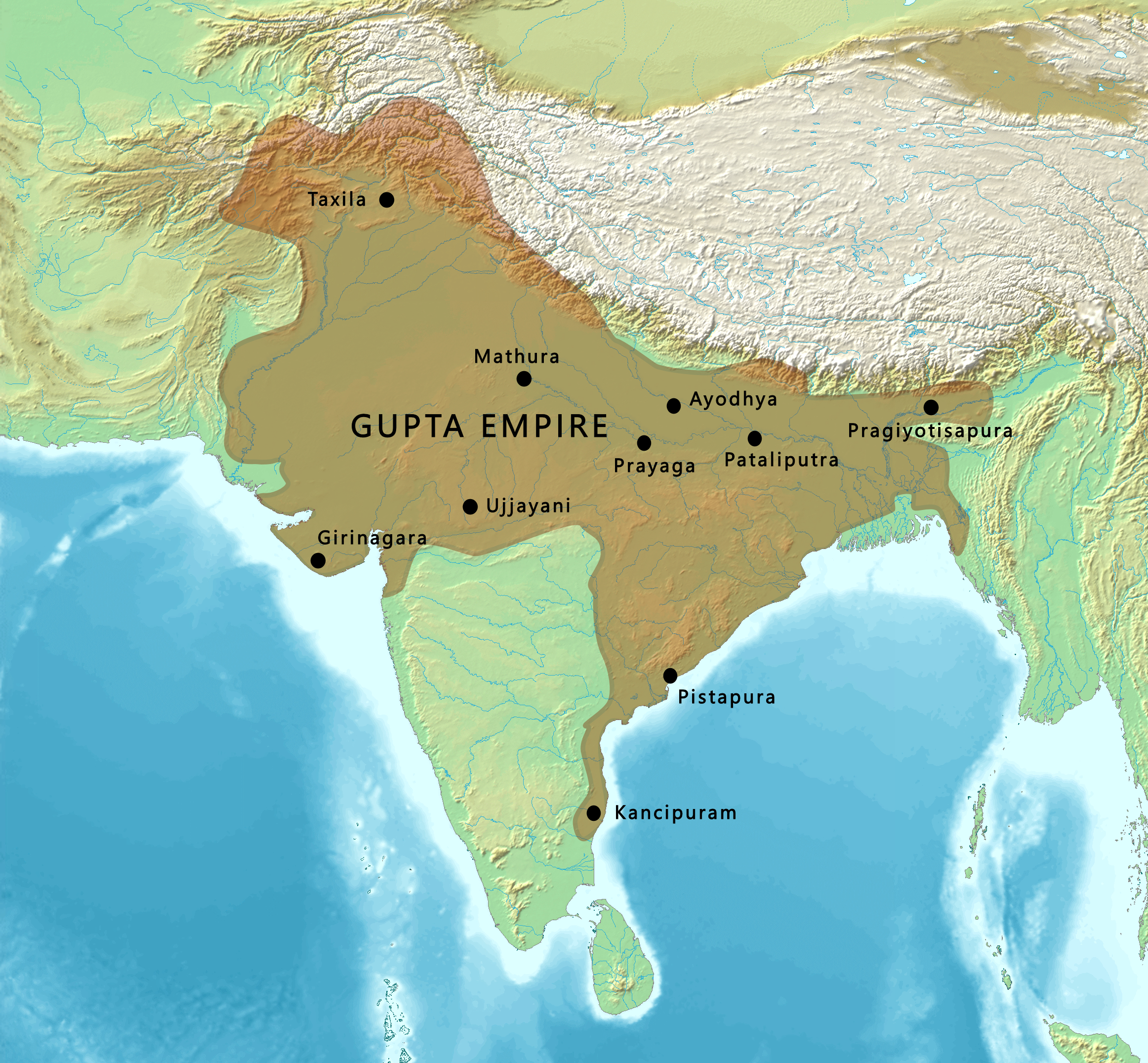
Approximate location of the Malavas within the Gupta Empire, and neighbouring polities in South Asia, circa 400-450 CE.

Post-Gupta records attest to the Malava presence in multiple regions, including present-day Madhya Pradesh and Gujarat.

=== Present-day Gujarat ===
Xuanzang (also 7th century) locates Malava (transcribed as 摩臘婆, "Mo-la-p'o") in present-day Gujarat, describing Kheta (Kheda) and Anandapura (Vadnagar) as parts of the Malava country. Xuanzang suggests that this Malava country was a part of the Maitraka kingdom. Like Banabhatta, he describes Ujjayini ("Wu-she-yen-na") as a distinct territory, but unlike Banabhatta, he locates Malava to the west of Ujjayini. The 7th century Aihole inscription of the Chalukya king Pulakeshin II, who defeated the Malavas, also locates them in present-day Gujarat. The 9th century Rashtrakuta records state that their emperor Govinda III stationed governor Kakka in the Lata country (southern Gujarat) to check the advance of the Gurjara-Pratiharas into Malava.

=== Present-day Madhya Pradesh ===
Although the region that ultimately came to be known as Malwa included Ujjain, the post-Gupta records distinguish between the territory of the Malavas and the region around Ujjain. Banabhatta's Kadambari (7th century) describes Vidisha in present-day eastern Malwa as the capital of the Malavas, and Ujjayini (Ujjain) in present-day western Malwa as the capital of the distinct Avanti kingdom. This Malava king was defeated by the Pushyabhuti king Rajyavardhana around 605 CE, as attested by Banabhatta's Harshacharita as well as the Pushyabhuti inscriptions. The distinction between these Malava and Ujjain regions is also found in the writings of the 9th century Muslim historian Al-Baladhuri, who states that Junayd, the Arab governor of Sindh, raided Uzain (Ujjain) and al-Malibah (Malava) around 725 CE.

From the 10th century onward, historical records use the term "Malavas" to refer to the Paramaras, who ruled the present-day Malwa region. It is probable that the Paramaras were descended from the ancient Malavas. However, they came to be called "Malavas" after they started ruling the Malwa region, which was named after the ancient Malavas. In the kayastha-prakasha's Vijayanti (c. 11th century), Avanti (the area around Ujjain) and Malava are stated to be identical. Thus, it appears that the present-day definition of Malwa became popular in the later half of the 10th century.

== Malavagan era ==
The era, which later became known as the Vikrama Samvat is associated with the Malavas. Initially it was mentioned as the Krita era and then as the Malavagans era. Most probably this era was mentioned as the Vikrama era for the first time in the Dholpur stone inscription of Chaitravamasakulam ruler Chaitarmahasena in 898 CE.

== Rulers ==
- Soma, under whom the Malavas re-asserted their independence from the Sakas of Ujjayini after the death of Rudrasena I
- Vishvavarman circa 423 CE.
- Bandhuvarman, his son and feudatory of Kumaragupta.

== See also ==
- Malwa
- Malwa (Punjab)
