= Rīsthal inscription =

Stone-slab inscription discovered in Madhya Pradesh, India

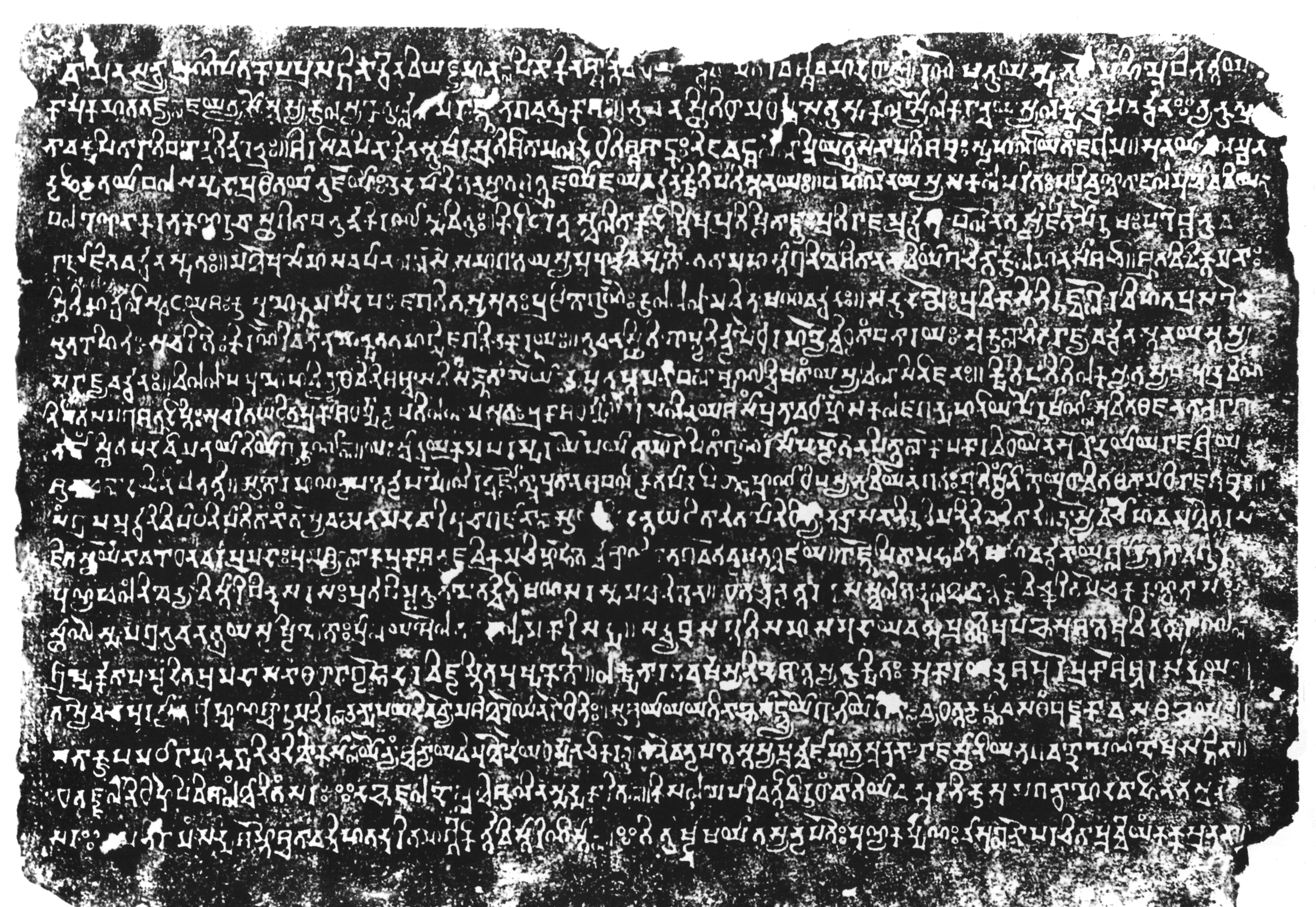
- Rīsthal inscription
- Material: Stone
- Created: c.515 CE
- Discovered: 24.1319°N 75.3360°E

Location
- Location of the Rīsthal inscription. Actual image of the inscription

The Rīsthal inscription is a stone-slab inscription which was discovered in 1983 in the area of Rīsthal near Mandsaur in Madhya Pradesh, India.

The inscription says that in 515 CE the Aulikara king Prakashadharma of Malwa defeated the Alchon Huns ruler Toramana in his campaigns into Central India, and took away the tusks of his elephants and his harem.

The portion of the inscription related to Toramana reads:

"He (Prakashadharman);
Who in battle rendered the title "Lord" of the Huna king false, (though it) had been firmly established on earth up to Toramana, whose footstool had glittered with the sparkling jewels in the crown of kings (that had bowed at his feet);
By whom auspicious seats were offered to the ascetics, splendid ones, made of the long tusks of that same (king's) elephants, whose rut was dripping (from their temples) while they were being shot down by (his) arrows at the battle front;

And by whom were carried off a choice of ladies of the harem of that same (king), whom he had defeated by his vigour in the thick of battle, after which he offered them to Lord Vrsabhadhvaja (Shiva) to mark the strength of the arms of the "Light of the World" (Lokaprakasa, i.e. Prakashadharman)

— Rīsthal inscription of Aulikara Prakashadharman, Year 570 (515 CE), translated by Richard Salomon (1989)

This ended the First Hunnic War in Indian territory, until Toramana's son Mihirakula attacked Central India a few years later.

== Full inscription ==
The purpose of the inscription is to record the construction of a tank, as well as the dedication of a Temple to Shiva by the Rajasthaniya Bagavaddosha in the reign of king Prakasadharma.

The inscription documents one of the Aulikaras royal houses, which comprised the following kings in the order of succession: Drumavardhana, Jayavardhana, Ajitavardhana, Vibhishanavardhana, Rajyavardhana and Prakashadharma (who defeated Toramana). In all probability, Yashodharman also belonged to this house and he was the son and successor of Prakashadharma.

- (V. 1) May the right half of the face of Pinakin (Siva), which exudes peace and which is conjoined with the left half of his face (i.e. Parvati's face) which displays anger because of Siva's submission to Sandhya (here personified as a female-rival), bring you auspiciousness.
- (V. 2) Victorious is Bhagavatprakasa who was the very banner of his family and was the leader of the kings and who constantly keeps the string of his bow taut in battles for the glory of the earth.

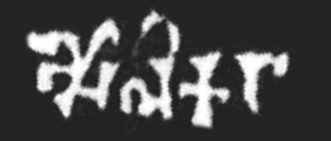
The word "Aulikara" (Late Brahmi script: Au-li-ka-ra) in the Risthal inscription. The first letter Au is a variation in a style specific to the 6-7th century.

- (V. 3) There was the very banner of all the Aulikara families, the king Drapavarddhana who was like a bridge between the established precepts of mankind and their righteous practice; who had attained eminence by destroying the strength of his enemies through his greatness.
- (V. 4) Just as the crescent moon on the head of Pinakin. (Siva), with its cool and pure rays like the sprinkling of thin shower, is covetable, so also, in the case of this (king), who was the banner of his family, the designation Senapati had become covetable.
- (V. 5) Having thus, through this, confirmed his strength and wealth by his arms, he sired a son, the king Jayavarddhana, who had appropriated victories from his enemies.
- (V. 6) Even as the dark clouds stopped the rays of the sun (from brightening the earth), so did the dust raised by his army and its elephant corps, spreading and covering all the atmosphere, indeed stop the rays of the Sun.
- (V. 7) His son was the king Ajitavarddhana who had earned his manliness from his enemies through his strength and who had established his hegemony over the heads of the enemy kings which were shining with the rays emerging out of the gems of their crowns.
- (V. 8) The lord of the gods (Indra) having gone to the earth repeatedly because of his ardent desire for imbibing the soma] drink at the sacrifices (performed by the king Ajitavarddhana), Sachi (Indrani) became worried about separation from her husband, with her chin resting on her fore-arm.
- (V. 9) His son who was famed in the world for his good qualities and who was like the banner of his family was Vibhishanavarddhana whose thoughts were profound because of learning; he was possessed of firmness, and was powerful and his fame was full-blown like a newly flowered tree.
- (V. 10) He rendered the worlds devoid of darkness by his good qualities which were ever on the increase, resplendent, brilliant, of Prakasadharman Aulikara all pervading and increasingly auspicious even as the sun brightens the worlds with his rays which are well-risen, resplendent, brilliant, all pervading and increasingly bright..
- (V. 11) His son was Rajyavarddhana who expanded his kingdom in keeping with his family's practice and who shouldered the burden (of the kingdom) which had been borne by the earlier kings who were protectors of worldly stability.
- (V. 12) The members of the harem of his enemy kings lamented, got bewildered, suffered, sighed and fainted, their minds beings tortured by the heat of his valor .
- (V. 13) Of that leader of kings the son was Prakasadharmma, the great king who had imbibed all the luster of his adversaries by the strength of his arms, whose lustrous merit was built of good characters
- (V. 14) Who had come by the royal status of his elders who were of unstained fame, worthy abodes of greatness, were possessed of valor which was considered great by the entire world and enjoyed the unbroken love of their subjects
- (V. 15) Who bore the noble royal grandeur, which was the source of auspicious results, for the sake of helping his subjects and not for the mere creation of pleasure, that royal grandeur which had come down through proper successions in his own family and which had been thrust upon him and not appropriated by him from his father.

=== Victory over Toramana ===
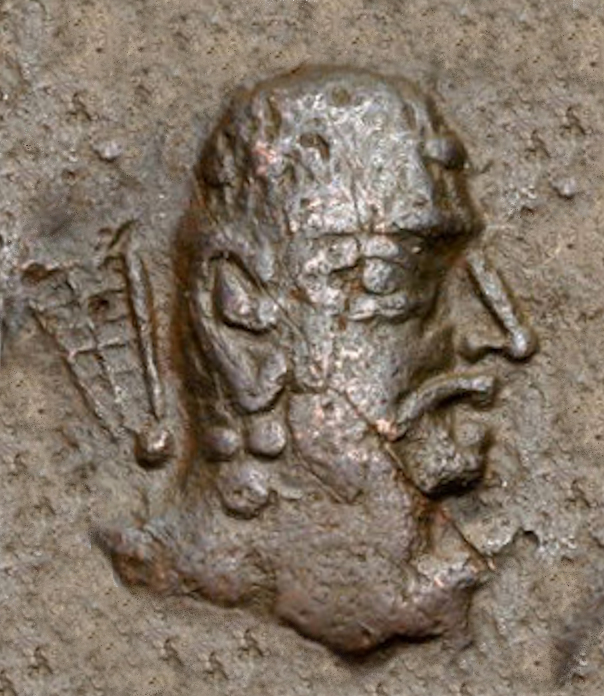
Portrait of Toramana. According to the Rīsthal inscription, Alchon Huns ruler Toramana was vanquished by Prakashadharma of Malwa in 515 CE.

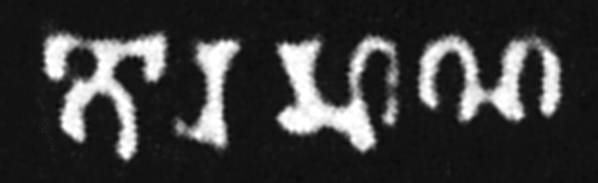
The name Toramana ( Toramāṇa) in Brahmi script, in line 12 (Verse 16) of the Risthal inscription.

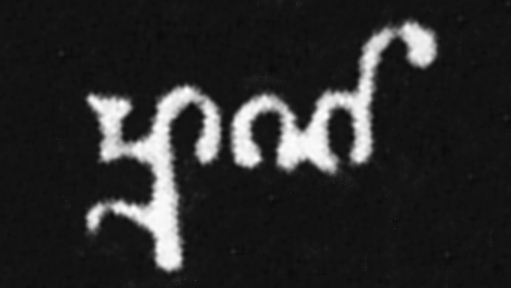
The word for Huna ( Hūṇā) in line 12 (Verse 16) of the Risthal inscription.

- (V. 16) By him, who had established himself in the kingdom of the Huna ruler through his foot-stool being flooded with the brightness of the gems of the kingly crown of the king Toramana, the word "Addhiraja" (Lord) was rendered false in the battle.
- (V. 17) He (ie. Prakasadharmma) presented to the ascetics shining Bhadrasanas made of the long-ivory tusks of the rutting elephants of the vanquished king which had been felled with large arrows on the battle-field.
- (V. 18) From the same king who had been quickly beaten in the battle field, by him (i.e. Prakasadharmma) were taken the choicest ladies of the harem and they were presented to the god Vrshabhadhvaja (Siva) as a symbol of the world-illuminating valor of his arms.
- (V. 19) By him was excavated this tank called "Vibhishana-saras", which looked like the replica of the extensive Bindusaras, after having apportioned in a praiseworthy gesture the meritorious fruits thereof to his grandfather, the king Vibhishanavarddhana.
- (V. 20) Besides, he got constructed a temple almost equal to that of the foot of the Himalayan mountain for the god Sthanu (Siva) who the cause of the creation of the three worlds and whose dark-blue neck was shining because of being covered by the rays emitted by the crescent moon which had slipped during his forceful dancing.
- (V. 21) When a total of five hundred and seventy two (Vikrama) years had been completed, when the god of Love was manifested in the interiors of the fountain-houses where were seen, along with their beloveds, damsels emaciated by the heat of the summer Sun.
- (V.22-23) By the directions of that king who was like the very symbol of Bharatavarsha, he (i.e. Bhagavaddosha whose name occurs in verse 26 below) got constructed, in Dasapura (Mandsaur), the palace. And, inside the same township (he got constructed) the beautiful temple of Brahman, which, with its cloud-barring pinnacles, was, as if, measuring the very skies
- (V. 24) Who, for the refuge of ascetics and for those who were intent upon practicing Sankhyayoga, established habitations named after Krishna and Bujjuka.
- (V. 25) Who, averse as he was to injustice, got implemented many acts of philanthropy and piety such as (the construction of) halls, wells, monasteries (mathas), pleasure gardens, and temples of the gods
- (V. 26-27) By him, Bhagavaddosha, the Rajasthaniya (Viceroy), who shunned demerits and who was the son of the minister of the predecessor of this king, this extensive tank, which puts to shame the sea itself, and this temple of Shulin (Siva), which pierces through the clouds, were respectively excavated and got constructed.
- (V. '28) For as along as the wind, which carries the pleasant fragrance of sweet smelling flowers turning the tender sprouts of the creepers, blows, this lovely tank and the temple of Sambhu may till then spread their fame devoid of all evil
- (V. 29) The eulogy of this king, who was a person of meritorious deeds, was composed by Vasula, the son of Kakka in the above words of praise.

— Rīsthal inscription of Aulikara Prakasadharman (1983 translation by K.V. Ramesh and S.P. Tewari).
