= Origin of the Huns =

Ethnological origin of the Huns

The origin of the Huns and their relationship to other peoples identified in ancient sources as Iranian Huns such as the Xionites, the Alchon Huns, the Kidarites, the Hephthalites, the Nezaks, and the Huna, has been the subject of long-term scholarly controversy. Ancient Greek and Roman sources do not provide any information on where the European Huns came from, besides that they suddenly appeared in 370 CE. However, there are some possible mentions of the Huns or tribes related to them that pre-date 370. Chinese sources, meanwhile, indicate several different, sometimes contradictory origins for the various "Iranian Hun" groups. In 1757, Joseph de Guignes first proposed that the Huns and the Iranian Huns were identical to the Xiongnu. The thesis was then popularized by Edward Gibbon. Since that time scholars have debated the proposal on its linguistic, historical, and archaeological merits. In the mid-twentieth century, the connection was attacked by the Sinologist Otto J. Maenchen-Helfen and largely fell out of favor. Some recent scholarship has argued in favor of some form of link, and the theory returned to the mainstream, but there is no consensus on the issue. It also remains disputed whether the various "Iranian Huns" belonged to a single or multiple ethnic groups.

The chief piece of evidence linking the Xiongnu to the European and Iranian Huns is the similarity of their names. Supporting evidence is provided by historical records indicating that the term Xiongnu was used for the people referred to in Sogdian and Sanskrit texts as the Xwn and Huṇa respectively, terms used for peoples called Huns in the West. Another important connection is the use of similar metallic cauldrons by the European Huns and the Xiongnu. Additionally, recent archaeogenetic studies have confirmed a similar profile of some Hun-era individuals to the Xiongnu. There remain a number of outstanding differences, however, including generally different archaeological profiles and a wide variety of customs attested among the various Hunnic groups. Additionally, there is a two hundred-year gap between the last recorded activities of the Xiongnu and the first appearance of the Huns in Europe and Central Asia. These issues have caused many scholars to reject the identification.

== History of the idea of Xiongnu origins ==
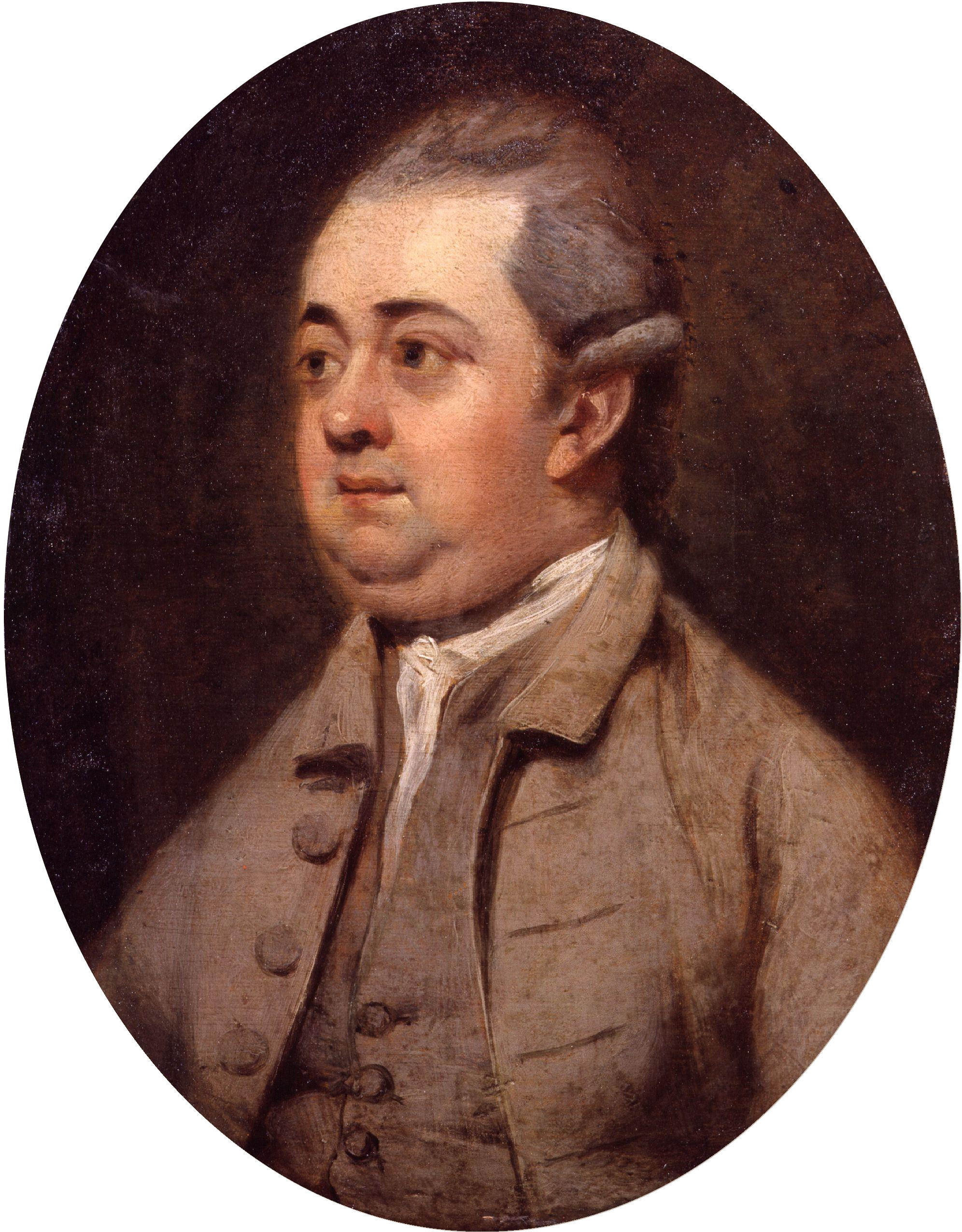
Edward Gibbon, who was instrumental in the spread of the notion that the Huns and Xiongnu were connected

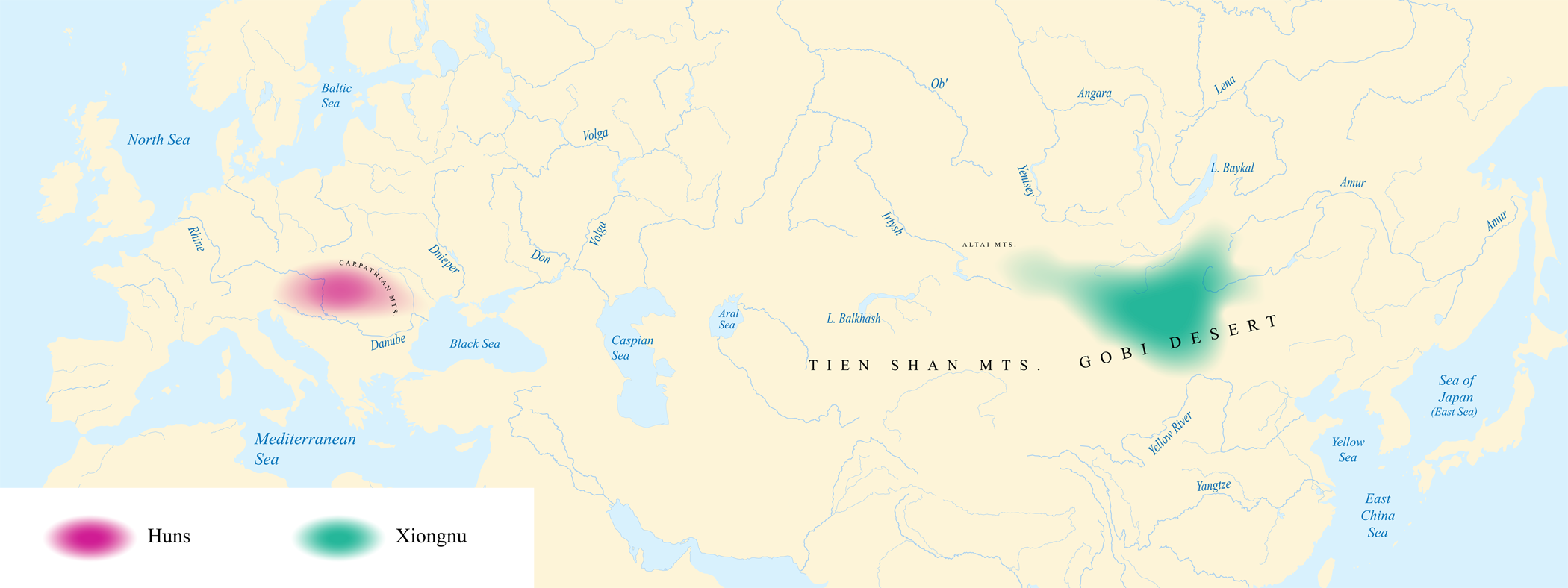
Geographical location of the Xiongnu empire and the heartland of the Huns.

Joseph de Guignes (1757) first proposed a connection between the European Huns and the Xiongnu on basis of the similarity between the nomadic lifestyles of both peoples and the similarity of their names. In making this equation, de Guignes was not interested in establishing any sort of cultural, linguistic, or ethnic connection between the Xiongnu and the Huns: instead, it was the manner of political organisation that made both "Huns". The equation was then popularized by its acceptance by Edward Gibbon in his The History of the Decline and Fall of the Roman Empire (1776–1789). David Curtis Wright derives the commonly repeated myth that the Great Wall of China was built to repel the Xiongnu from a passage in Gibbon. Gibbon argued, from his reading of de Guignes, that the Iranian ("White") and European Huns derived from two distinct divisions of the Xiongnu that survived the destruction of their regime near China proper. After Gibbon, this thesis quickly became widely accepted among various historians of the Huns.

In the nineteenth century, the question was mostly debated by linguists who sought to relate the name and language of the Xiongnu or Huns to one another. Because language was closely associated with ethnicity to nineteenth-century scholars, it became necessary to prove both the physical descent of the Huns from the Xiongnu and that they had shared the same language. While the theory of Xiongnu origins remained popular, a number of scholars raised objections because they believed that the Huns spoke a Finno-Ugric language, whereas the Xiongnu spoke a Turkic or Mongolic language. Similarly, some nineteenth-century Russian scholars argued that the Huns spoke a Slavic language and thus could not be descended from the non-Slavic-speaking Xiongnu. In the late nineteenth century, the classical historian J. B. Bury questioned de Guignes and Gibbon's identification of the Huns with the Xiongnu, arguing that they merely had similar names. He later revised this position, however, and came to accept the link.

At the beginning of the twentieth century, German Sinologist Friedrich Hirth discovered passages in the Chinese annals, principally the Wei shu, which he believed proved the connection between the Huns and the Xiongnu. Hirth's work convinced many, and by the 1940s there was a general consensus among historians and archaeologists that the Xiongnu and the Huns were related. However, in 1945 Otto J. Maenchen-Helfen argued that Hirth had misinterpreted the Chinese annals. Through Maenchen-Helfen's work, "[t]he Hirth thesis was dealt a considerable blow". Maenchen-Helfen also argued against the identification based on then-current archaeology and on ethnographic grounds. Maenchen-Helfen would go on to cast doubt on new theories that equated the Huns and the Xiongnu on the basis of their names in several articles and his most import work The World of the Huns (1973). Maenchen-Helfen's skepticism was also taken up by prominent Eurasianist Denis Sinor.

Writing in 2009, Christopher Beckwith refers to there being a "general consensus among Eurasianists" that the Xiongnu and Huns are not related. This consensus has been challenged by historian Étienne de la Vaissière (2005 and 2015), historian and linguist Christopher Atwood (2012), archaeologist Toshio Hayashi (2014), and historian Hyun Jin Kim (2013 and 2015). Writing in 2020, Alexander Savelyev and Choongwon Jeong refer to the proposed connection as having "only limited support in modern scholarship", while Warwick Ball, writing in 2021, writes that there is "no general consensus" and that "scholarship is divided" on the issue.

== Etymological evidence ==
=== Equivalency of "Hun" names in the primary sources ===
The chief piece of evidence connecting the Chinese Xiōngnú to the various peoples known exonymically as Huns is the apparent similarity of the names given to them. These include: Greek Οὖννοι (Ounnoi), Latin Hunni, Sogdian Xwn, Sanskrit Hūṇa, Middle Persian Ẋyon and Armenian Hon-k'.

The equivalence of the meaning of Ẋyon to Hun is shown by Syriac use of Hūn to refer to the people called Ẋyon in Persian sources, while Zoroastrian texts in Persian use Ẋyon for the people called Hūṇa in Sanskrit. Étienne de la Vaissière has shown that Xiōngnú and the Sogdian and Sanskrit terms Xwm and Hūṇa were used to refer to the same people.

There are few primary sources in which such groups refer to themselves by such names. The primary sources are also generally those of adversaries; only on a single seal of the Kidarite ruler Uglarg and a seal of questionable authenticity that may have been recovered from Kosambi, is a title such as "king of/over the Huns" used. The Chinese Wei shu also attested a title Wēnnàshā for the Kidarite rulers from Bactria who conquered Sogdia, which Christopher Atwood and Kazuo Ennoki interpret as a Chinese transcription of Onnashāh, meaning king of the Huns.

The fact that the Hephthalites never explicitly identify themselves as Huns on their coins, simply as ēbodālo (ηβοδαλο), has been cited by Christopher Beckwith, to argue that the Hephthalites were not a subgroup of Huns. They are sometimes called "White Huns" by the Greek historian Procopius and "White Hūṇa" (Śvēta Hūṇa) by Sanskrit authors. By comparison, the name element -khon(n)o or -khan(n)o, attested on the Alchon coins, has been argued by Frantz Grenet to represent the ethnic name Hun, with al- being a Turkic word for "red"; however, this interpretation is disputed as the Bactrian word for "Hun" is *uono (plural uonono).

=== Significance of the equivalency ===
Different scholars have taken the use of the various terms to refer to the same people in different languages in different ways.

Some scholars take the name to be a endonym used by the Huns themselves. Both de la Vaissière and Kim regard the apparent use of the same name by the European and Iranian Huns as a claim of political continuity between the Xiongnu and later Hunnic groups. Walter Pohl, on the other hand, understands the name "Hun" to have been a claim of ethnic identity without any necessary political component, given that multiple "Hun" polities existed at the same time. Otto Maenchen-Helfen regarded at least the Iranian Huns (the Chionites, Hephthalites, and Huna) as having had the same name, though he questioned the significance of this fact. Richard Frye argued that the various Iranian Huns deliberately used the name Hun in order to frighten their enemies.

Other scholars argue that the name Hun may have been an exonym, used by other peoples to describe the various Hunnic groups. Christopher Atwood suggests it may have been the name used by Iranian-speaking merchants and interpreters. Hans Bakker instead argues that the word, as it appears to be mostly used by the Huns' enemies, may be a pejorative term that derives from the Chinese "Xiongnu" in its literal meaning of "savage slaves". Scholars such as H.W. Bailey and Denis Sinor have argued that the name Hun may have been a generic name for steppe nomads, deriving from the Iranian word Ẋyon, meaning enemies.

Both Pohl and Atwood argue that the use of the name either by or to refer to the various Hunnic groups does not prove a migration.

Other scholars have rejected the similarity of the names entirely. Referring to the Huns and the Xiongnu, Denis Sinor argued that it was merely "a fortuitous consonance of the two names" that had led to the identification. Christopher Beckwith, on the other hand, believes that the Old Chinese form of "Xiongnu" was not pronounced at all like the name "Hun" (see below).

=== Form of the name "Xiongnu" in Old Chinese ===
It is unclear how the name transcribed as "Xiongnu" in modern Chinese was actually pronounced and how accurately it transcribed the self-designation of these people. Christopher Beckwith notes that the pronunciation of Xiongnu in Old Chinese is uncertain. While it was likely pronounced *χoŋnʊ or *χʲoŋnʊ in Middle Chinese, it is possible it was taken into Old Chinese before the change of initial s to χ, meaning it could correspond to an Iranian name like Saka or skuδa (Scythian). In 2022, he argued that the name was in fact a transcription of the name Sogdia (Old Chinese *Suŋlâ ← *Suɣla ← *Sugda), and thus referred to an Eastern Iranian group. E.G. Pulleyblank suggested an Old Chinese pronunciation similar to *flông-nah and connected this name to a nomadic people attested in Greek as the Phrounoi (Φροῦνοι). Maenchen-Helfen further notes that the Chinese transcription is only an approximation of their actual name. As proof of its imprecision, he notes that Emperor Wang Mang actually renamed the Xiongnu as the Hsiang-nu, with the first element meaning "to submit", while on bad terms with the group. Later, when on good terms, he renamed them Kung-nu, with the first element meaning "respectful".

Christopher Atwood reconstructs the Old Chinese form of Xiōngnú as either *x(r)joŋ-na, *hɨoŋ-na, *hoŋ-nâ or *xoŋ-NA, thus dismissing Beckwith's or Pulleyblank's suggestion. However he notes a number of additional problems with equating the Western forms of the name Hun with the name Xiōngnú: 1) Xiōngnú has two syllables, while Sogdian, Armenian, Syriac, and Persian words have one, and in Greek and Latin the second syllable seems to be a case ending; 2) Xiōngnú begins with the velar spirant x, whereas Sanskrit and Armenian have the glottal spirant h, and Greek lacks a spirant; 3) Xiōngnú has a velar nasal ŋ, whereas Sanskrit has a retroflex nasal ṇ and the other forms have the dental nasal n; 4) Xiōngnú has a semi-vowel ʲ or ɨ before the main vowel, whereas only Persian has a semi-vowel before its main vowel. Atwood's solution to these difficulties is to posit that the Western versions all derive, directly or indirectly, from Sanskrit Hūṇa, which is an independent transcription of the same name rendered by the Chinese as Xiōngnú, and which also appears in Greek as Χωναι (Khōnai). He further argues that the Persian form Ẋyon is not etymologically related to the other names, but rather an "archaicizing" name that simply sounded similar to the name Hun.

== Textual evidence ==
=== Classical sources on the origins of the European Huns ===
Classical sources do not provide much information on the origin of the European Huns. They assert that the Huns appeared in Europe suddenly around 370. Ammianus Marcellinus places their origin in the Caucasus region, near the Sea of Azov. Most typically, Roman writers' attempts to elucidate the origins of the Huns simply equated them with earlier steppe peoples, such as the Royal Scythians, but also the Parthians and even the Trojan War. Roman writers repeated a tale that the Huns had entered the domain of the Goths while they were pursuing a wild stag, or else one of their cows that had gotten loose, across the Kerch Strait into Crimea. Discovering the land good, they then attacked the Goths. Jordanes' Getica relates that the Goths held the Huns to be offspring of "unclean spirits" and Gothic witches (Getica 24:121).

Both Maenchen-Helfen and Denis Sinor argue that nothing can be established about the origin of the Huns beyond what is said in classical sources. Modern scholars have sometimes interpreted mentions of earlier peoples as possible references to the Huns before 370. Hyun Jin Kim argues that a people identified by the 2nd century AD geographer Ptolemy as the Khounoi (Χοῦνοι, Chu(n)ni) were an earlier mention of the Huns. However, other scholars such as E. A. Thompson, and Maenchen-Helfen have disputed the identification of the Khounoi and the Huns. Sinor identifies the Khounoi's name with the Huns but argues that this does not mean it was the same group as the Huns who appeared in Europe two centuries later.

=== Textual sources for the origins of the Iranian Huns ===
Textual sources for the history of the "Iranian Huns" are few in number and often imprecise, and it is unclear whether these people had the same or different origins. (Note: Originally, scholars considered all of the so-called "Iranian Huns" to be Hephthalites, the group which is best known. However, more recent scholarship distinguishes several distinct groups: the Chionites, Kidarites, Hephthalites, Alchon Huns, Nezak Huns and possibly the Zunbils. It is debated whether the Hephthalites and the Alchon Huns are separate dynasties, with the argument for distinct dynasties supported by numismatics. Recent scholarship typically distinguishes between an original Chionite invasion and the Kidarite dynasty on the one hand and later dynasties that arose such as the Hephthalites and Alchon Huns on the other.) The state of the textual sources means that the coins minted by these groups are the best sources for their history. Contemporary sources refer to the "Iranian Huns" by a wide variety of names, but most commonly as Chionites.

Chinese sources on the "Iranian Huns" describe several distinct waves of invaders who followed the same route to Iran; in addition to mentioning Xiongnu, they also describe two groups of Yüeh-zhi (the "Greater" and the "Lesser"), sometimes described as fleeing from the Xiongnu and sometimes from the Rouran. The first group mentioned in Byzantine sources are the Chionites, who attacked Bactria around 350 CE. Later Greek languages sources refer to the Kidarites as a distinct group of Chionites. Regarding the Hephthalites, the 7th-century CE Chinese ambassador Wei Jie suggested a connection to a people known as the Kangju, but expressed confusion about their ultimate origins; other Chinese sources suggest an origin in Turfan in the Tarim Basin. Additionally, Chinese sources sometimes associate the Hephthalites with a term Hua, which modern scholars have connected to Uar/Avars. The roughly contemporary Greek Pseudo-Joshua always refers to the Hephthalites as Huns or Chionites, while the later Procopius calls them Hephthalites, a name widely attested in various languages, as well as White Huns.

Scholars are divided as to whether the "Iranian Huns" invaded in several waves, as indicated by Chinese sources, or in a single wave. De la Vaissière and Kim argue for a single invasion and that its timing (around 350 CE) indicates a connection to the European Huns, as does the part of central Asia that they emerged from. Martin Schottky, however, argues that while the invasions of the "Iranian Huns" may have been "causally related" to those of the European Huns, the people were not directly connected to the European Huns.

=== Proposed textual evidence for a link of the Hunnic groups ===
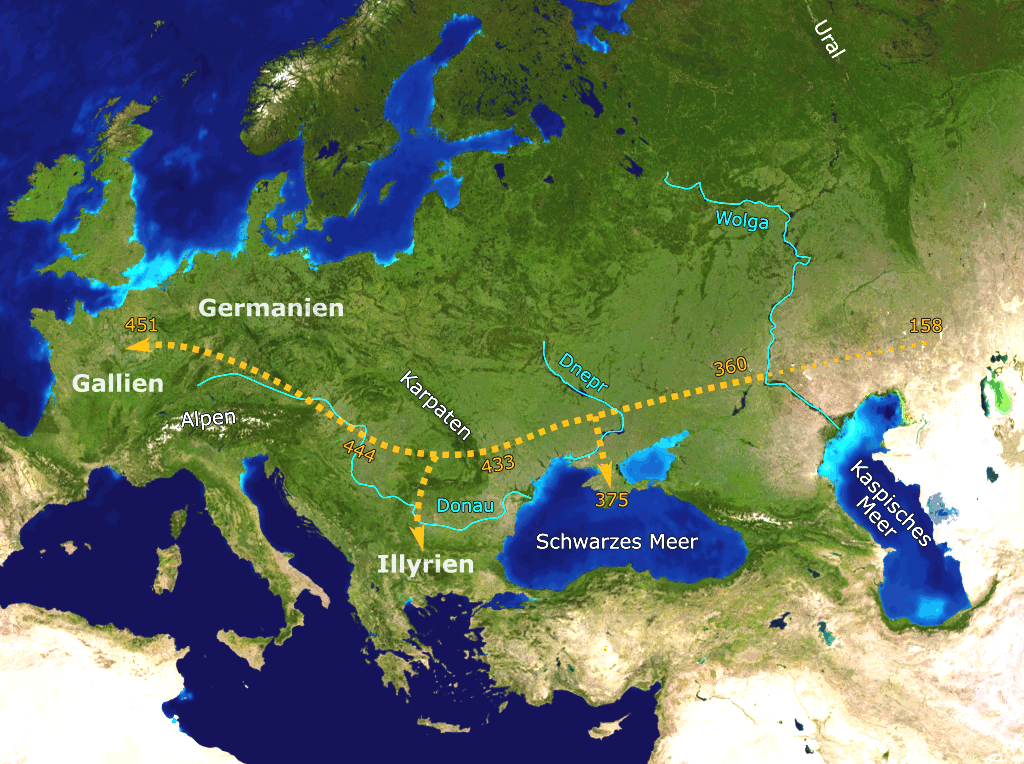
Suggested path of the Huns' migration into Europe (labels in German).

There is a gap of about two hundred years between the disappearance of the Xiongnu from Chinese historical records (following their displacement by the Xianbei) and the appearance of the Huns in Greco-Roman sources. According to the Book of the Later Han, the final known Xiongnu emperor either disappeared to the west or moved to the territory of the Wusun in modern Kazakhstan in 91 CE. According to the Wei shu, they then moved farther west to around modern Tashkent, where they were defeated by the Xianbei in 153 – after this, nothing further is recorded about them for two centuries.

Other scholars have put forth evidence from non-European sources to support a link. Writing in third-century China, a Buddhist monk from northern Bactria (modern Afghanistan), named Zhu Fahu (in Chinese) or Dharmarakṣa (in Sanskrit), translated the ethnonym "Huṇa" from Sanskrit into Chinese as "Xiongnu". This is the earliest attested usage of the name Huṇa, and Étienne de la Vaissière argues that "the use of the name Huṇa in these texts has a precise political reference to the Xiongnu". A second important piece of textual evidence is the letter of a Sogdian merchant named Nanaivande, written in 313: the letter describes raids by the "Xwn" on cities in Northern China. Contemporary Chinese sources identify these same people as the Xiongnu. De la Vaissière, therefore, concludes that "'Hun/Xwn/Huṇa' were the exact transcriptions of the name that the Chinese [...] had rendered as 'Xiongnu'"( See etymological evidence).

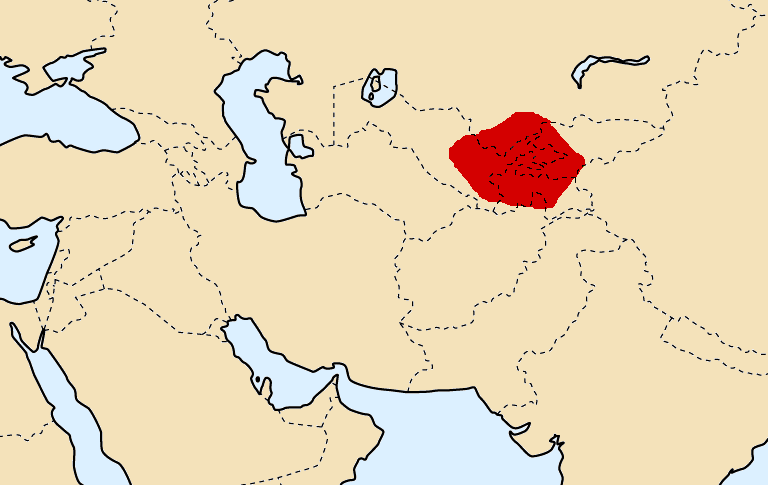
Location of ancient Sogdia superimposed on modern borders.

Another important historical document supporting the identification is the Wei shu. Scholar Friedrich Hirth (1909) believed that a passage in the Wei Shu identified the Xiongnu as conquering the Alans and the Crimea, the first conquests of the European Huns. Otto Maenchen-Helfen was able to show that Hirth's identification of the people and land conquered as the Alans and the Crimea was untenable, however: the Wei Shu instead referred to a conquest of Sogdia by a group that Maenchen-Helfen identified with the Hephthalites, and much of the text was corrupted by later interpolations from other sources. De la Vaissière, however, notes that a Chinese encyclopedia known as the Tongdian preserves parts of the original Wei Shu, including the passage discussed by Hirth and Maenchen-Helfen: he notes that it describes the conquest of Sogdia by the Xiongnu at around 367, the same time that Persian and Armenian sources describe the Persians fighting the Chionites. A fifth-century Chinese geographical work, the Shi-san zhou ji by Gan Yi, notes that the Alans and Sogdians were under different rulers (the European Huns and the Chionites respectively), suggesting some believed that they had been conquered by the same people.

== Archaeological evidence ==
=== Problems with archaeological evidence ===
Archaeology has discovered few links between the material culture of the Huns and Eastern Central Asia. There are important differences between the burial practices and settlement patterns of the Xiongnu and European Huns. However, there are still no generalized studies comparing the archaeology of the Xiongnu and Huns. The most common archaeological links across Eurasia are bronze cauldrons (see below) and mirrors, as well as the components of the Hunnic style composite bow, and the practice of artificial cranial deformation (see below). The use of archaeology to trace proposed migrations of ethnic groups across Eurasia has been criticized for a simplistic interpretation of the spread of objects and for its conflation of material culture with an ethnicity. Ursula Brosseder further argues that archaeology is unlikely to prove or disprove any migration, as such movements often leave no trace in the archaeological record. Nevertheless, many archaeologists do support the theory of a Xiongnu migration westward.

Ursula Brosseder attributes the spread of similar artifacts between the Huns and the Xiongnu to trade and cultural influences across the Silk Road rather than to migration. All historically attested migrations on the steppe have been rapid, whereas items such as cauldrons said to show Xiongnu migrations westward move very slowly. Susanne Hakenbeck and Ulf Büntgen write that although archaeology does not demonstrate a rapid migration across the steppe, it nevertheless indicates extensive connections across Eurasia.

Archaeological data on the Iranian Huns is very limited; writing in 2015, de la Vaissière stated that Hunnic cemeteries in Central Asia are largely unknown. Moreover, the dating of sites is often inexact. Writing in 2023, Roberta Di Tanno found that there were significant differences between cemeteries in 4th–6th century CE Central Asia, especially Sogdiana and Tokharestan, and Xiongnu-era Mongolia and Transbaikal, with differing practices in construction of tombs, as well as the nature, number, and types of grave goods. She argues that archaeology thus does not support a migration of Xiongnu groups to Central Asia. The various "Iranian Huns'" presence in India has also left little trace in the archaeological record. There is little archaeological evidence for the Hephthalites besides coins, meaning that archaeology sheds little light on their origins.

=== Hunnic cauldrons ===
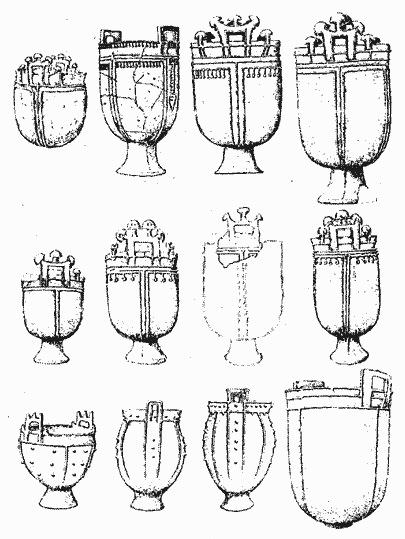
Types of Hunnic cauldrons

The most significant potential archaeological link between the European Huns and the Xiongnu are the similar bronze cauldrons used by the Huns and the Xiongnu. The cauldrons used by the European Huns appear to be a further development of cauldrons that had been used the Xiongnu. Kim argues that this shows that the European Huns preserved the Xiongnu cultural identity. Toshio Hayashi has argued that one might be able to track the westward migration of the Huns/Xiongnu by following the finds of these cauldrons.

Ursula Brosseder, however, argues that there are no intermediate types between the forms of the cauldron known for the Xiongnu and those known for the European Huns. She also notes that the cauldrons, as a single archaeological artifact, cannot prove a Xiongnu-Hun migration. Nor can it be assumed, she argues, that the Huns and Xiongnu used their cauldrons in the same manner, as the Xiongnu cauldrons are usually deposited in graves, whereas the Hun cauldrons are found deposited alone near water. Pohl further notes that such cauldrons are absent from the areas controlled by the "Iranian Huns", Bactria and Sogdia.

=== Artificial cranial deformation ===
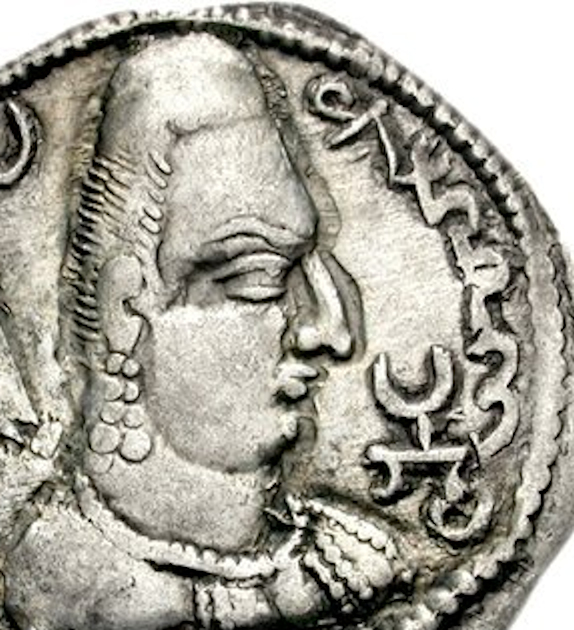
The Alchon ruler Khingila's portrait on a coin, displaying what appears to be artificial cranial deformation

Artificial cranial deformation is attested by Hun-period burials in Europe as well as for the Alchon Huns via depictions on their coins and elsewhere, possibly suggesting a cultural link. The earliest evidence for the practice in Eurasia comes from the Tien Shan Mountains around the 2nd century BCE. This population was argued by Soviet archaeologists V. V. Ginzburg and E. V. Zhirov to be part of the Xiongnu. More recently Damgaard et al. 2018 argued that the Xiongnu migrated westward after the fall of their Empire and mixed with the Sakas in this area. In Europe, artificial cranial deformation appears to have become a local practice; as of 2022 genetics studies of Migration-Period individuals with modified skulls from a cemetery in Bavaria and one in Serbia showed only two to have had any East Asian ancestry.

However, there is no evidence for the practice among the Mongolian Xiongnu or in Mongolia more generally, meaning that Hunnic groups would have to have adopted it after moving west. The spread of artificial cranial deformation also does not match the rapid spread of the Huns. Susanne Hakenbeck writes that the practice was so widespread across Eurasia and found in burial and settlement contexts that differ so greatly from each other that it is impossible to associate it as originating with a particular ethnic group.

Not all of the "Iranian Huns" engaged in artificial cranial deformation. It is unclear whether the Hephthalites did so: while coins have been used as evidence, many scholars now believe that these were minted by the Alchon—this makes attempts to associate burials featuring artificially deformed skulls with the Hephthalites problematic. Likewise, the coins of the Kidarites do not display elongated skulls, though this could be because they copied earlier models on their coinage.

=== Further potential links ===
Heather notes that both groups made use of similar weapons. Maenchen-Helfen, however, argues that the arrowheads used by the various "Hunnic" groups are quite different from one other.

== Ethnographic and linguistic evidence ==
=== Appearance ===
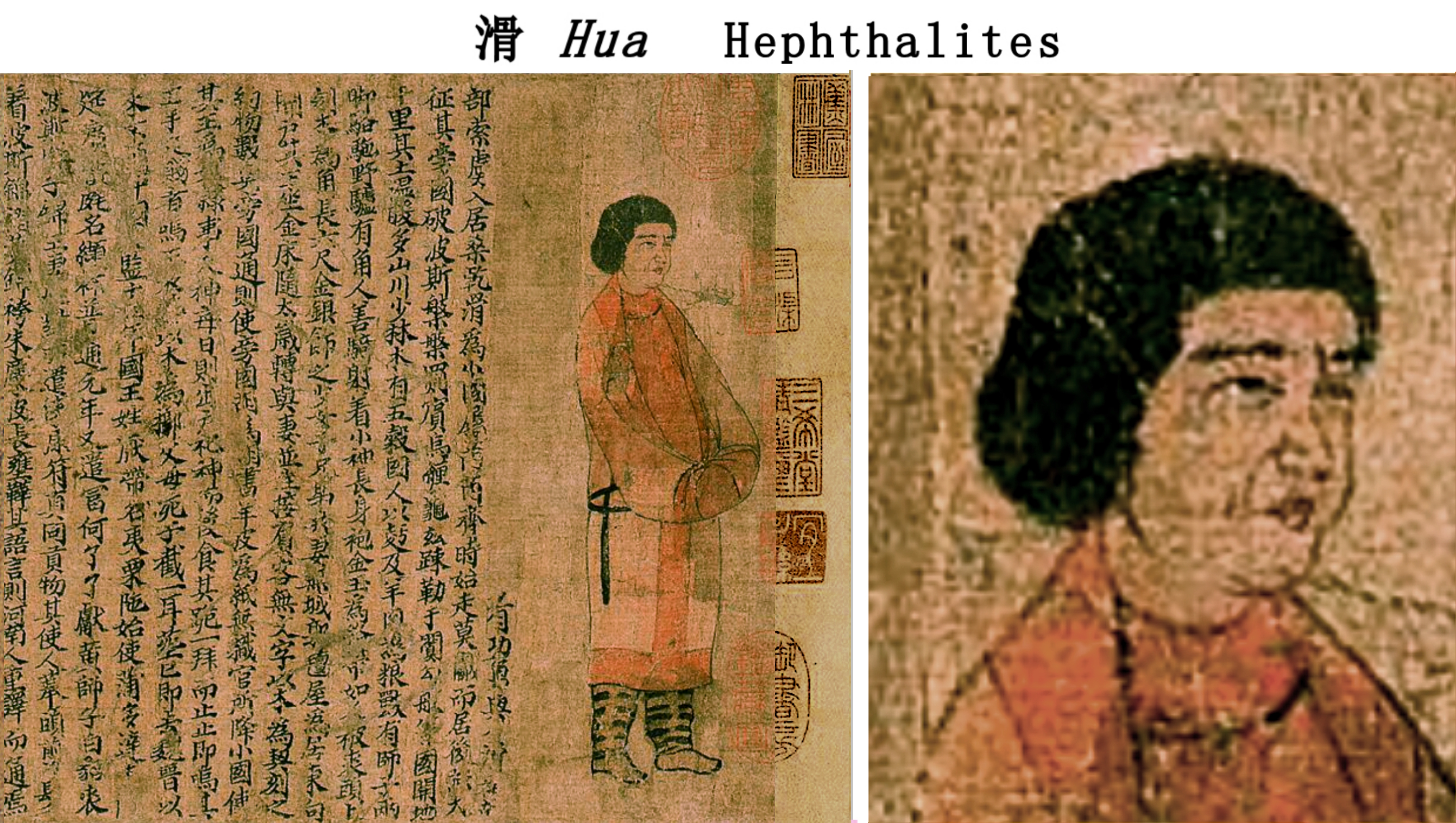
Image of a Hephthalite ("Hua") embassador at the Chinese court of Southern Liang in the capital Jingzhou in 516–526 CE. The appearance of the ambassador has been used to argue that the Hephthalites had East Asian characteristics.

The European Huns are described in Roman sources in such a way as to suggest their East Asian ("Mongoloid") appearance, which matches Chinese descriptions of the Xiongnu. However, both Otto Maenchen-Helfen and Hyun Jin Kim caution against seeing the European Huns as a racial homogeneous group, despite both arguing that many individuals likely had an East Asian appearance. In contrast, some scholars have argued that the Huns were predominantly "Caucasian" in appearance. Other archaeologists have argued that "Mongoloid" features are found primarily among members of the Hunnic aristocracy.

The appearance of the Hephthalites is subject to dispute. Procopius claims that the Hephthalites had "white bodies", whereas the other Huns were darker skinned. Hyun Jin Kim argues that Procopius was simply misled by the use of "white" in the name "White Huns", which actually refers to geography, not skin tone. The facial features of the Hephthalite ("Hua") envoy to the Chinese depicted in Portraits of Periodical Offering have been argued to show that the Hephthalites had "Mongolian" features; Kazuo Enoki, however, noted that the Hua is described as having curly hair, which does not accord with East Asian features.

=== Ethnographic descriptions ===
Ethnographic descriptions have caused scholars such as Peter Heather to doubt a connection between the Huns and Xiongnu. For instance, the Xiongnu are described as wearing queues, whereas the Huns are not.

Many scholars have used the description of the Hephthalites in Procopius to argue against their relation to other Hunnic groups: Procopius describes the Hephthalites as differing from "any of the Huns known to us". In particular, Otto Maenchen-Helfen and Kazuo Enoki have argued that the practice of polyandry ascribed to the Hephthalites indicates a separate ethnic origin. Maenchen-Helfen notes that the European Huns practiced polygamy, while Enoki noted that polyandry is rare except on the Tibetan Plateau. He believed that this showed a local origin for the Hephthalites rather than on the Eurasian Steppe. De la Vaissière, however, argues that evidence shows that this was a local Bactrian custom adopted by the Hephthalites. Khodadad Rezakhani also argues that while Procopius describes the Hephthalites as different from the Huns known in Europe, this does not mean that he or his audience thought they differed from the Huns found in Iran.

=== Governance ===
Heather argues that a difference between the Xiongnu and the Huns is that the Xiongnu had a unified state and a ruler bearing the title of chanyu, whereas the European Huns seem to have arrived without any single leader. Michael David Ethington notes that confederative government without a strong ruler was common among steppe nomads and argues for its existence among the earlier Alchon Huns as well as in Ammianus Marcellinus's account of the European Huns.

Kim argues that the Huns actually did arrive in Europe under unified rule, but that this is not directly reflected in surviving sources. Warwick Ball generally agrees with Kim that the Huns were more organized than is usually believed, as evidenced by their simultaneous invasion of the Roman and Persian empires. Another potential similarity between Xiongnu and Hunnic governance is that the agreements that the Huns reached with the Roman Empire were similar to those made between the Xiongnu and Chinese; however Ball cautions that these agreements were "probably fairly standard ones between nomadic and sedentary states", with the Goths having made a similar treaties in 332 and 367.

=== Religious practice ===
Almost nothing is known about the religion of the European Huns. They seem to have consulted oracle bones, which may suggest a Chinese link. Additionally, Kim argues that the use of cauldrons by the Xiongnu and Huns may suggest religious continuity between them, a claim which is challenged by Ursula Brosseder (see archaeological evidence). Warwick Ball notes that what little is known of Hunnic and Xiongnu religion and mythology show both similarities and differences, with similarities often shared by many steppe peoples.

As a cultural similarity between the Huns and Xiongnu, Kim notes that both appear to have practiced a sword cult (for the Xiongnu known as the kenglu, known in Western sources as the "Sword of Mars"). Arguing for a shared ethnic and political past of the Hephthalites/Alchon Huns with the Huns and Xiongnu, de la Vaissière suggesting that the etymology of the Alchon ruler Khingila means "friend of kenglu", with kenglu understood as a war god. The worship of a war god as a sword is widely attested among steppe peoples. Denis Sinor, however, holds the worship of a sword among the Huns to be apocryphal.

The Xiongnu are argued as having worshiped the sky and steppe deity Tengri, with the apparent Old Chinese form of the name, Cheng-li, used once in the Book of Later Han to refer to the Xiongnu emperor. S. P. Arjunan argues that the importance of shamans and their advice in Tengric religion and the apparent presence and use of shamanic advice by the European Huns indicate the European Huns worshiped Tengri; he further argues that this makes it likely that the Iranian Huns did as well. Maenchen-Helfen also suggests the possibility that the European Huns may have worshipped Tengri, but notes that the name of this god is not attested in European records until the ninth century.

=== Language ===
There is no consensus as to what language the Huns spoke; many of their names may be Yeniseian or Turkic, but others appear to be Germanic and Iranian. Likewise, the Xiongnu appear to have included speakers of nearly every language-group of the Eurasian steppe, and there is no consensus as to which language was spoken by their elite, with various scholars arguing in favor of Yeniseian, Turkic, Mongolic, and Iranian. The language of the Hephthalites is likewise uncertain.

Nevertheless, scholars have made linguistic arguments about the identity of the various Hunnic groups. In 2025, Svenja Bonmann and Simon Fries proposed Yeniseian etymologies for three Hunnish names and for various river names along the proposed migratory route of the Xiongnu to Europe; they argue that both the European and Asian Huns appear to have spoken a language related to Arin, and that this supports a close connection between the two groups.

Other scholars have used linguistics to argue against identification. Maenchen-Helfen argues that the Xiongnu appear to have spoken a Mongolic language, whereas he believes the Huns spoke a Turkic language and the Hephthalites spoke an Iranian language. Elsewhere, Maenchen-Helfen speaks of the Hephthalites as "the only exception" to the fact that various Hunnic groups (excluding the Xiongnu) seem to have spoken the same language. Linguistic arguments against the identification are also used by Christopher Beckwith in 2022, relying partially on his own research into the Hunnic and Xiongnu language: he holds the Huns to have spoken Turkic while the Xiongnu spoke an Iranian language.

Among scholars who accept that the Huns and Xiongnu appear to have spoken different languages, some have argued that the Hunnic groups could have changed languages: Peter Golden and de la Vaissière argue that the Hephthalites may have spoken an Altaic language and later adopted an Iranian language from the sedentary population they ruled; Golden argues that "[i]n this, their behavior was typical of nomads". In 2013, Hyun Jin Kim argued, on the basis of work by E. G. Pulleyblank and A. Vovin, that the Xiongnu elite likely spoke a Yeniseian language, but switched to being Turkic-speaking during their migrations westward. In 2017, he instead suggested "that the whole debate may well be futile given the multifaceted identity of that [Xiongnu] elite and the multilingual empire they governed".

== Genetic evidence ==
Genetic data is difficult to apply to steppe nomad societies, because they frequently migrated, intermixed, and were assimilated into each other. Nevertheless, genetics can supply information on migrations from East Asia to Europe and vice versa. As of 2023, there is little genetic data from the Carpathian basin from the Hunnic period (5th century), and the population living there during the Hunnic period shows a variety of genetic signatures. Maróti et al. 2022 showed that the genomes of 9 Hun-era individuals from the basin varied from European to Northeast Asian connections, with those individuals showing associations with Northeast Asia being most similar to groups found in Mongolia such as the Xiongnu and the Xianbei.

=== Individual studies ===
In a genetic study on individuals from around the Tian Shan mountains in Central Asia dating from the late second century CE, Damgaard et al. 2018 found that these individuals represented a population of mixed East Asian and West Eurasian origin. They argued that this population descended from Xiongnu who expanded westward and mixed with Iranian Sakas. This population in the Tian Shan mountains may be connected to the European Huns by individual burials that contains objects stylistically related to those used by the European Huns, although this could be a sign of the exchange of goods and the connections between elites rather than a sign of migration.

A genetic study published in Scientific Reports in November 2019 examined the remains of three males from 5th century Hunnic cemeteries in the Pannonian Basin. The three specimens were found to have had mixed European and East Asian ancestry. (Note: Neparáczki et al. 2019 "All Hun age individuals revealed admixture derived from European and East Asian ancestors.") They carried paternal haplogroups Q1a2, R1b1a1b1a1a1 and R1a1a1b2a2. Q1a2 is closely associated with Tian Shan Huns and Scytho-Sarmatian populations, while R1b1a1 is associated with Germanic speakers, and R1a-Z93 is broadly associated with Indo-Iranian and Xiongnu populations. The haplogroup results were consistent with a Xiongnu origin of the Huns. (Note: Neparáczki et al. 2019, p. 1. "Haplogroups from the Hun-age are consistent with Xiongnu ancestry of European Huns.") All of the Hunnic males studied were determined to have had brown eyes and dark brown hair or black hair, and two had intermediate skin color, while another had dark-to-black skin color.

However, Savelyev & Jeong et al. 2020 reports while there is East Eurasian genetics detected in the Huns, no ancient genome from the Carpathian basin has been reported to test the Eastern Eurasian genetic connection, but such a conclusion was also based on the lack of Xiongnu archaeogenetics samples. At the same time, the Western Eurasian population connected with various Indo-European languages of Europe (Germanic and Ossetic, in particular) played a crucial role in the formation of Huns. Many of the Huns' names suggest they were European locally but have connection with Turkic speakers. While the Huns do have some steppe ancestry there isn't even enough evidence to directly link the Huns only with the Xiongnu. In the same year Keyser et al. 2020 examined 52 Xiongnu skeletal remains and found that the Xiongnu shared paternal (R1a1a1b2a-Z94, R1a1a1b2a2-Z2124, Q1a and N1a) and maternal haplotypes with the Huns, and suggested on this basis that the Huns were descended from Xiongnu, who they in turn suggested were descended from Scytho-Siberians. (Note: Keyser et al. 2020, pp. 1, 8–9. "[O]ur findings confirmed that the Xiongnu had a strongly admixed mitochondrial and Y-chromosome gene pools and revealed a significant western component in the Xiongnu group studied.... [W]e propose Scytho-Siberians as ancestors of the Xiongnu and Huns as their descendants... [E]ast Eurasian R1a subclades R1a1a1b2a-Z94 and R1a1a1b2a2-Z2124 were a common element of the Hun, Avar and Hungarian Conqueror elite and very likely belonged to the branch that was observed in our Xiongnu samples. Moreover, haplogroups Q1a and N1a were also major components of these nomadic groups, reinforcing the view that Huns (and thus Avars and Hungarian invaders) might derive from the Xiongnu as was proposed until the eighteenth century but strongly disputed since... Some Xiongnu paternal and maternal haplotypes could be found in the gene pool of the Huns, the Avars, as well as Mongolian and Hungarian conquerors.")

Gnecchi-Ruscone et al. 2021 analyzed the remains of two elite 4th century Huns from Kazakhstan and Hungary. Their paternal haplogroups were assigned to R1a-Z94 and R1a-Z645. One of these Huns carried the maternal haplogroup D4. They clustered closely with Hunnic remains from Inner Asia and more broadly with Ancient Northeast Asians. (Note: Gnecchi-Ruscone et al. 2021. "We observe an intensification of the new eastern Eurasian influx described above among the individuals from the early 1st millennium CE ('Xianbei_Hun_Berel_300CE') as well as the later 7th- to 11th-millennium CE individuals ('Karakaba_830CE' and 'Kayalyk_950CE'). They are scattered along PC1 from the main IA Tasmola/Pazyryk cluster toward the ANA groups (Fig. 2C). The two individuals associated with Hun elite burials dated from the third century CE, one from the site of Kurayly in the Aktobe region in western Kazakhstan and the other from Budapest, Hungary ('Hun_elite_350CE'), cluster closely together along this cline (Fig. 2C and figs. S1 to S3).") The next year, Gnecchi-Ruscone et al. 2022 examined a 5th-century male from Árpás, Hungary. He belonged to paternal haplogroup R1a-Y57 and maternal haplogroup H5, (Note: Gnecchi-Ruscone et al. 2022 Table S1.) and clustered closely with West Eurasians.

A 2022 study by Maróti et al. 2022 described the ancestry of Hunnic remains. Hunnic remains from Asia were assigned to a group designated Asia_Hun_Core, which was of predominantly East Asian ancestry and closely related to the Xiongnu. On the other hand, other Hunnic remains from Europe showed substantially higher Sarmatian ancestry. A third segment of the Hunnic samples clustered closely with Northwestern Europeans. The authors described the paternal haplogroups of 23 Asian and European Hunnic samples: 43% belonged to haplogroup R1a-Z93, while 39% belonged to Q-M242, both of which were likely inherited from the Xiongnu. 17% belonged to sub-clades of R1a that are associated with modern Northwestern Europeans, in line with the Germanic affinities of some specimens.

In 2025, a study by Gnecchi-Ruscone et al. 2025 combined archaeological data with genome sequencing of 370 individuals—from the Carpathian Basin (5th–6th century CE), Central Asia (2nd–5th century CE), and the Mongolian steppe (2nd century BCE–1st century CE Xiongnu period). The analysis found no evidence that a large, uniform eastern/steppe-derived group populated the Hun and post-Hun Carpathian Basin. Instead, the high genetic diversity among eastern-type burials indicates that the invading steppe conquerors had mixed origins. However, the discovery of long-shared genomic segments links some elite Xiongnu individuals directly with certain European Huns, suggesting that at least part of the European Hun population descended from the Xiongnu elite.

== Works cited ==
- Arjunan, S. P. (2023). "HŪṆAS IN EARLY INDIA: UNDERSTANDING THE PROCESS OF ASSIMILATION AND ADAPTATION". Proceedings of the Indian History Congress. 83: 204–213. JSTOR 27388316.
- Atwood, Christopher P. (2012). "Huns and Xiōngnú: New Thoughts on an Old Problem". In Boeck, Brian J.; Martin, Russell E.; Rowland, Daniel (eds.). Dubitando: Studies in History and Culture in Honor of Donald Ostrowski. Cambridge University Press. pp. 27–52. ISBN 978-0-8-9357-404-8.
- Bakker, Hans T. (2020). The Alkhan: A Hunnic People in South Asia. Barkhuis. doi:10.2307/j.ctv13nb6sv. ISBN 978-94-93194-00-7. JSTOR j.ctv13nb6sv. S2CID 244654797.
- Bailey, H. W. (1954). "Hārahūṇa". In Schubert, Johannes; Schneider, Ulrich (eds.). Asiatica: Festschrift für Friedrich Weller zum 65. Geburtstag. Leipzig: Harassowitz. pp. 12–21.
- Ball, Warwick (2021). The Eurasian Steppe: People, Movement, Ideas. Edinburgh University Press. doi:10.1515/9781474488075. ISBN 978-1-4744-8807-5. S2CID 248348684.
- Beckwith, Christopher I (2009). Empires of the Silk Road: A History of Central Asia from the Bronze Age to the Present. Princeton University Press. doi:10.1515/9781400829941. ISBN 978-1-4008-2994-1.
- Beckwith, Christopher I (2022). The Scythian Empire: Central Eurasia and the Birth of the Classical Age from Persia to China. Princeton University Press. doi:10.1515/9780691240541. ISBN 978-0-691-24054-1. S2CID 234184277.
- Bonmann, Svenja; Fries, Simon (2025). "Linguistic Evidence Suggests that Xiōng-nú and Huns Spoke the Same Paleo-Siberian Language". Transactions of the Philological Society. 0 1467-968X.12321. doi:10.1111/1467-968X.12321.
- Borbély, Noémi; et al. (2023). "High Coverage Mitogenomes and Y-Chromosomal Typing Reveal Ancient Lineages in the Modern-Day Székely Population in Romania". Genes. 14 (1): 133. doi:10.3390/genes14010133. PMC 9858685. PMID 36672874.
- Brosseder, Ursula B. (2018). "Xiongnu and Huns: Archaeological Perspectives on a Centuries-Old Debate about Identity and Migration". In Di Cosmo, Nicolo; Maas, Michael (eds.). Empires and Exchanges in Eurasian Late Antiquity: Rome, China, Iran, and the Steppe, ca. 250–750. Cambridge University Press. pp. 176–188. doi:10.1017/9781316146040.015.
- Chaojung, Ching; Galambos, Imre (2020). "Chinese Sources". In Balogh, Dániel (ed.). Hunnic Peoples in Central and South Asia: Sources for their Origin and History. Barkhuis. pp. 1–112. JSTOR .ctv13nb6vw.8.
- Damgaard, P. B.; et al. (May 9, 2018). "137 ancient human genomes from across the Eurasian steppes". Nature. 557 (7705). Nature Research: 369–373. Bibcode:2018Natur.557..369D. doi:10.1038/s41586-018-0094-2. hdl:1887/3202709. PMID 29743675. S2CID 13670282.
- Di Tanno, Roberta (2023). "Western Central Asia Between the Fourth and Sixth Centuries CE: The 'Iranian Huns' and Their Alleged Migration". Rivista degli Studi Orientali. XCVI: 44–67.
- Enoki, Kazuo (1955). "The Origin of the White Huns or Hephthalites". East and West. 6 (3): 231–237. JSTOR 29753725.
- Ethington, Michael David (2021). "The Hunnic Dilemma: Between Identity and Environmental-Economic Crises". Journal of Asian Civilizations. 43 (2): 109–120.
- Frye, Richard N. (1984). The History of Ancient Iran. Munich: Beck. ISBN 978-3-406-09397-5.
- Gnecchi-Ruscone, Guido Alberto; Khussainova, Elmira; Kahbatkyzy, Nurzhibek; Musralina, Lyazzat; Spyrou, Maria A.; Bianco, Raffaela A.; Radzeviciute, Rita; Martins, Nuno Filipe Gomes; Freund, Caecilia; Iksan, Olzhas; Garshin, Alexander (March 2021). "Ancient genomic time transect from the Central Asian Steppe unravels the history of the Scythians". Science Advances. 7 (13) eabe4414. Bibcode:2021SciA....7.4414G. doi:10.1126/sciadv.abe4414. PMC 7997506. PMID 33771866.
- Gnecchi-Ruscone, Guido Alberto; Szécsényi-Nagy, Anna; Koncz, István; Csiky, Gergely; Rácz, Zsófia; Rohrlach, A. B.; Brandt, Guido; Rohland, Nadin; Csáky, Veronika; Cheronet, Olivia; Szeifert, Bea (2022-04-14). "Ancient genomes reveal origin and rapid trans-Eurasian migration of 7th century Avar elites". Cell. 185 (8): 1402–1413.e21. doi:10.1016/j.cell.2022.03.007. ISSN 0092-8674. PMC 9042794. PMID 35366416.
- Gnecchi-Ruscone, Guido Alberto; Rácz, Zsófia; Liccardo, Salvatore; Lee, Juhyeon; Huang, Yilei; Traverso, Luca; Radzevičiūtė, Rita; Hajnal, Zsuzsanna; Szécsényi-Nagy, Anna; Gyuris, Balázs; Mateovics-László, Orsolya; Bernert, Zsolt; Szeniczey, Tamás; Hajdu, Tamás; Mészáros, Boglárka; Bálint, Marianna; Mende, Balázs Gusztáv; Miller, Bryan; Samashev, Zainolla; Childebayeva, Ainash; Djansugurova, Leyla; Geary, Patrick; Ringbauer, Harald; Vida, Tivadar; Jeong, Choongwon; Pohl, Walter; Krause, Johannes; Hofmanová, Zuzana (2025-02-24). "Ancient genomes reveal trans-Eurasian connections between the European Huns and the Xiongnu Empire". PNAS. 122 (9) e2418485122. Bibcode:2025PNAS..12218485G. doi:10.1073/pnas.2418485122. PMC 11892651. PMID 39993190.
- Golden, Peter B. (1992). An Introduction to the History of the Turkic Peoples: Ethnogenesis and State-Formation in Medieval and Early Modern Eurasia and the Middle East. Wiesbaden: Harrassowitz. ISBN 978-3-447-03274-2.
- Hakenbeck, Susanne (2018). "Infant Head Shaping in Eurasia in the First Millennium ad". In Crawford, Sally; Hadley, Dawn M.; Shepherd, Gillian (eds.). The Oxford Handbook of the Archaeology of Childhood. Oxford University Press. pp. 483–504. doi:10.1093/oxfordhb/9780199670697.013.26.
- Hakenbeck, Susanne; Büntgen, Ulf (2022). "The role of drought during the Hunnic incursions into central-east Europe in the 4th and 5th c. CE". Journal of Roman Archaeology. 35 (2): 876–896. doi:10.1017/S1047759422000332.
- Hayashi, Toshio (2014). "Huns were Xiongnu or not? From the Viewpoint of Archaeological Material". In Choi, Han Woo; Şahin, Ilhan; Kim, Byung Il; İsakov, Baktıbek; Buyar, Cengiz (eds.). Altay Communities: Migrations and Emergence of Nations. Print(ist). pp. 27–52. ISBN 978-975-7914-43-3.
- Heather, Peter (2007). The fall of the Roman Empire: a new history of Rome and the barbarians. New York: Oxford University Press. pp. 146–167. ISBN 978-0-19-515954-7.
- Heather, Peter (2010). Empires and Barbarians: The Fall of Rome and the Birth of Europe. Oxford University Press. ISBN 978-0-19-973560-0.
- Keyser, Christine; et al. (July 30, 2020). "Genetic evidence suggests a sense of family, parity and conquest in the Xiongnu Iron Age nomads of Mongolia". Human Genetics. 557 (7705). Springer: 369–373. doi:10.1007/s00439-020-02209-4. PMID 32734383. S2CID 220881540.
- Kim, Hyun Jin (2015). The Huns. Routledge. ISBN 978-1-138-84175-8.
- Kim, Hyun Jin (2013). The Huns, Rome and the Birth of Europe. Cambridge University Press. ISBN 978-1-107-00906-6.
- Kim, Hyun Jin (2017). "The Xiongnu". Oxford Research Encyclopedia of Asian History. doi:10.1093/acrefore/9780190277727.013.50. ISBN 978-0-19-027772-7.
- Kradin, Nikolay (2018). "Ancient Steppe Nomad Societies". Oxford Research Encyclopedia of Asian History. doi:10.1093/acrefore/9780190277727.013.3. ISBN 978-0-19-027772-7.
- Kradin, Nikolay N. (2019). "Some Aspects of Xiongnu History in Archaeological Perspective". In Hao, Chen (ed.). Competing Narratives between Nomadic People and their Sedentary Neighbours: Papers of the 7th International Conference on the Medieval History of the Eurasian Steppe Nov. 9–12, 2018 Shanghai China. Vol. 53. University of Szeged. pp. 149–165. doi:10.14232/sua.2019.53.149-165. ISBN 978-963-306-708-6.
- Kurbanov, Aydogdy (2013). "The Hephthalites Disappeared or Not?". In Gemil, Tasin (ed.). Studia et Documenta Turcologica. PRESA UNIVERSITARĂ CLUJEANĂ. pp. 87–94. ISSN 2344-6560.
- Kurbanov, Aydogdy (2014). "The Hephthalites: iconographical materials". Tyragetia. 8 (1): 317–334.
- Maenchen-Helfen, Otto J. (1945). "Huns and Hsiung-Nu". Byzantion. 17: 222–243. JSTOR 44168589.
- Maenchen-Helfen, J. Otto (1966). "ΘΕΓΡΙ and Tengri". The American Journal of Philology. 87 (1): 80–83. doi:10.2307/292978. JSTOR 292978.
- Maenchen-Helfen, Otto J. (1973). Knight, Max (ed.). The World of the Huns: Studies in Their History and Culture. University of California Press. ISBN 978-0-520-01596-8.
- Maenchen-Helfen, Otto J. (1959). "The Ethnic Name Hun". In Egerod, Soren (ed.). Studia Serica Bernhard Karlgren dedicata. pp. 223–238.
- Man, John (2005). Attila: The Barbarian who Challenged Rome. New York: St. Martin's Press. ISBN 978-0-553-81658-7.
- Maróti, Zoltán; Neparáczki, Endre; Schütz, Oszkár (2022-05-25). "The genetic origin of Huns, Avars, and conquering Hungarians". Current Biology. 32 (13): 2858–2870.e7. Bibcode:2022CBio...32E2858M. doi:10.1016/j.cub.2022.04.093. PMID 35617951. S2CID 246191357.
- Mayall, Peter; Pilbrow, Varsha; Bitadze, Liana (February 2, 2017). "Migrating Huns and modified heads: Eigenshape analysis comparing intentionally modified crania from Hungary and Georgia in the Migration Period of Europe". PLOS ONE. 12 (2) e0171064. Bibcode:2017PLoSO..1271064M. doi:10.1371/journal.pone.0171064. PMC 5289542. PMID 28152046.
- Molnár, Mónika; et al. (April 2014). "Artificially deformed crania from the Hun-Germanic Period (5th–6th century AD) in northeastern Hungary: historical and morphological analysis". Journal of Neurosurgery. 36 (4): E1. doi:10.3171/2014.1.FOCUS13466. PMID 24684322.
- Neparáczki, Endre; et al. (November 12, 2019). "Y-chromosome haplogroups from Hun, Avar and conquering Hungarian period nomadic people of the Carpathian Basin". Scientific Reports. 9 (16569). Nature Research: 16569. Bibcode:2019NatSR...916569N. doi:10.1038/s41598-019-53105-5. PMC 6851379. PMID 31719606.
- Pohl, Walter (2014). "Goths and Huns". In McInerney, Jeremy (ed.). A Companion to Ethnicity in the Ancient Mediterranean. Wiley Blackwell. pp. 555–568. doi:10.1002/9781118834312.ch37. ISBN 978-1-4443-3734-1.
- Pohl, Walter (2018). "Ethnicity and Empire in the Western Eurasian Steppes". In Di Cosmo, Nicola; Maas, Michael (eds.). Empires and exchanges in Eurasian late antiquity: Rome, China, Iran, and the steppe, ca. 250 – 750. Cambridge University Press. pp. 189–205. doi:10.1017/9781316146040.016. ISBN 978-1-316-14604-0.
- Rezakhani, Khodadad (2017). ReOrienting the Sasanians: East Iran in Late Antiquity. Edinburgh University Press. doi:10.1515/9781474400305. ISBN 978-1-4744-0030-5. S2CID 248014025.
- Saag, Lehti; Staniuk, Robert (2022). "Historical human migrations: From the steppe to the basin". Current Biology. 32 (13): 38–41. Bibcode:2022CBio...32.R738S. doi:10.1016/j.cub.2022.05.058. PMID 35820383. S2CID 250443139.
- Savelyev, Alexander; Jeong, Choongwon (2020). "Early nomads of the Eastern Steppe and their tentative connections in the West". Evolutionary Human Sciences. 2 e20. Cambridge University Press (CUP). doi:10.1017/ehs.2020.18. ISSN 2513-843X. PMC 7612788. PMID 35663512.
- Schottky, Martin (2004). "Huns". Encyclopaedia Iranica.
- Sinor, Denis (1990). "The Hun Period". In Sinor, Denis (ed.). The Cambridge history of early Inner Asia (1. publ. ed.). Cambridge [u.a.]: Cambridge Univ. Press. pp. 177–203. ISBN 978-0-521-24304-9.
- Sinor, Denis (2005). "Hun Religion". In Jones, Lindsay (ed.). Encyclopedia of Religion. Vol. 6 (2nd ed.). Macmillan Reference. pp. 4228–4229. ISBN 978-0-02-865733-2. OCLC 56057973.
- Thompson, E. A. (1996). Heather, Peter (ed.). The Huns. Blackwell Publishers. ISBN 978-0-631-15899-8.
- Thompson, E. A. (1946). "Christian Missionaries among the Huns". Hermathena. 67 (67): 73–79. JSTOR 23037831.
- de la Vaissière, Étienne (2003). "Is There a 'Nationality of the Hephtalites'?". Bulletin of the Asia Institute. New series. 17: 119–132. JSTOR 24049310.
- de la Vaissière, Étienne (2015). "The Steppe World and the Rise of the Huns". In Maas, Michael (ed.). The Cambridge Companion to the Age of Attila. Cambridge University Press. pp. 175–192. ISBN 978-1-107-63388-9.
- Whitfield, Susan (2018). Silk, Slaves, and Stupas: Material Culture of the Silk Road. University of California Press. doi:10.1525/9780520957664. ISBN 978-0-520-95766-4.
- Wright, David Curtis (1997). "The Hsiung-Nu-Hun Equation Revisited". Eurasian Studies Yearbook. 69: 77–112.
