= Gangadhar Stone Inscription of Viśvavarman =

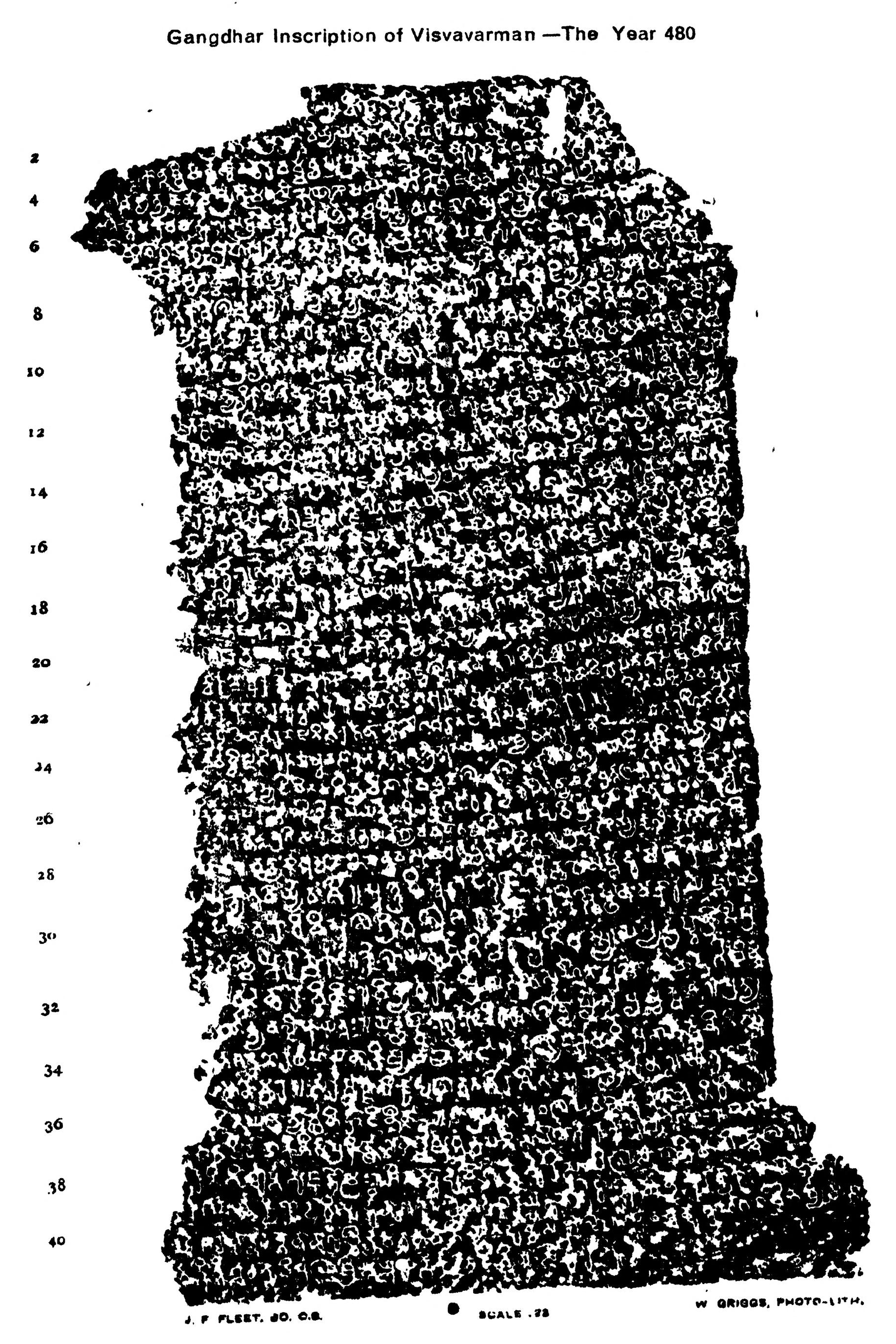
- Gangadhar Stone Inscription of Viśvavarman.
- Material: Stone
- Created: 423-24 CE

The Gangadhar Stone Inscription of Viśvavarman is an epigraphic record documenting that documents of a temple at Gangadhar town in the fifth century during the reign of the Aulikara king Viśvavarman.

== Location ==
Gangadhar is located in Jhalawar district, Kota division, Rajasthan, India. The town occupies an old fortified and moated site on the banks of the Kali Sindh River.

== Publication ==
The text of the Gangadhar inscription was edited and published by John Faithfull Fleet in 1888. It was subsequently edited by D. C. Sircar.

== Description and Contents ==
The inscription, written in Sanskrit, records the building of a temple of Viṣṇu and an accompanying shrine for the mother goddesses or Mātṛkas by a king's minister named Mayūrākṣaka. The goddess shrine is specifically described as a "terrifying abode of the divine Mothers" (mātṛṇāṃ veśmātyugraṃ). The inscription is dated anno 480, on the bright thirteenth day of the month Kārttika. The year corresponds to 423-24 CE.

== Historical significance ==
The Gangadhar inscription is important for the history of Indian religion because, in the description of the Mother goddess shrine, it provides the first documented use of the term ḍakinī, a class of goddesses in Tantric traditions It is not known exactly what texts and ritual traditions were used in Gangadhar in the early 5th century, but they were almost certainly Shaiva.

The description of the goddesses has also prompted debate because it appears, at first glance, to give the oldest description of a Tantric temple. The discussion of the word tantra in the record has been summarised by David Lorenzen. These interpretations were revisited by Bruce M. Sullivan who noted: "To me, it makes a lot more sense to take it in the usual meaning for tāntra, namely, stringed instrument. Thus, we get the climatic effects mentioned in the inscription being caused by music (accompanied by booming clouds), not by “magic rites” (Fleet) nor by tantric texts (Lorenzen)." Responding indirectly to Sullivan's call for the inscription to be studied closely, Michael Willis noted that the word given is tāntra rather than tantra. Following André Padoux, Willis remarked that "... the word tāntra in the inscription has little to do with occidental Tantrism but rather with a stringed musical instrument, i.e. an object on which the strings are ‘stretched’ (√tan) across a curved frame." He thus re-edited and re-translated the relevant verse as follows:

mātṛṇāñ ca [*pracu]ditaghanātyartthanihrādinīnām |

tāntrodbhūtaprabalapavanodvarttitāmbhonidhīnām |

[- - - - - - ]gatam idaṃ ḍākinīsaṃ prakīrṇṇam |

veśmātyuggraṃ nṛpatisacivo kārayat puṇyahetoḥ ||

A place filled with ḍākinī-s and characterised by ...

An abode of the Mothers whose thunderous cries impel the rain clouds,

and whose treasure – the waters – bursts forth

with the mighty wind produced by their lyre.

== Translation ==
. . . . . . . . . . . . . . . . the arm of (the god) Vishnu; . . . . . . . . . . . . . . . . the serpentine movements of the trunk of (Airâvata) the elephant of (Indra) the lord of the gods . . . . . . . . . . . . . . . . . . . . . . . . . . . . . . . . . . . ! (Line 2.)— Born in a lineage of rulers of the earth who were possessed of renowned prowess and fame . . . . . . . . . . . . . . . . . . . . . . . . . . . beautiful . . . . . . . . . . . . . . . there was the illustrious king Naravarman, the famous one;— who pleased the gods with sacrifices, the saints with observances of a noble nature . . . . . . . . . . . . . . . . . . . . . . . . . . . . . . . (his) servants with honourable treatment that was unequalled in the world, and the whole earth with excellent achievements;— [who] . . . . . . . . . . . . . . . the appliances of elephants and horses . . . . . . . . . . . . . in [battle-fields] which were full of the rays of (his) sword; (and whose) enemies, losing the power of motion through fear, are destroyed (by simply) seeing his face in the van of war. (L. 5.)— [His son] . . . . . . . . . . . . . . . . . . . magnanimous; equal to Brihaspati in intellect; possessed of a countenance like the full-moon; the standard of comparison, as it were, for (even) Râma and Bhagîratha; . . . . . . . . . . . . . . . . . . . . . . . on the earth, (was) Visvavarman;— who surpassed (the mountain) Mêru in firmness, Vainya in hereditary virtue, the moon in development of lustre, (the god) Vishnu in strength, and the most unendurable fire of universal destruction in brilliance, and (Indra) the lord of the gods in prowess;—who, when he grasps (his) weapon, cannot be gazed upon even for a moment by (his) enemies, whose eyes are blinded by fear, just like a sun, which, turning back upon (its) course, has an unendurable form and a brilliant and terrible lustre that is heightened by rising in a cloudless sky;— to whom obeisance is performed by the waterlilies which are the faces of the lovely women of (his) enemies, frightened beforehand by (hearing of) the prowess of (his) strength, (and now) destitute of ornaments, moist on the cheeks with the water of the tears that cling there, (and) deprived of beauty by having their wearing of adornments stopped;— whose forces, moreover, have reverence done to them by [the oceans], the palmyra-trees on the shores of which are beautified by the lustre of the production of jewels (from the waters); the rows of the foam on which are broken through by the terrified sharks and marine monsters; (and) all of whose hands, which are their waves, are shaken about by a fierce wind;—at the time of the journeying forth of whose army, the earth has (its) thickets emptied of the beasts and birds which flee away from fear of the lances that uproot the trees and make the mountains tremble, and, having (its) highways made uneven by protuberances, sinks down as it were (under the tread of his troops);— whose reputation has respect paid to it in a reverential manner in the sky by the Vidyâdharas, bound in the fetters of the arms of (their) mistresses, who are blinded by the radiance, directed towards (them), of the rays of the jewels in (his) diadem, (and) the upper parts of whose cheeks are shaded by the lifting up of (their) joined hands in the act of respectful salutation;— and who, even when he was still in early youth, nourished (his) pure intellect by following the sacred writings, and now effects the protection of the world like Bharata, pointing out, as it were, the path of the true religion among kings. While he, the king, the bravest among kings, is governing the earth, just as (Indra) the lord of the gods, of unmeasured majesty, (governs) the heavens, there is never any one [among mankind] who delights in wickedness, [or] is beset by misfortune, or is destitute of happiness. (L. 19.)— And when four hundred fully complete auspicious years, together with the eightieth (year), had here gone by; on the bright thirteenth day of the month Kârttika which brings happiness to the thoughts of all mankind;— in the seasons which abounds with waters that are of a reddish-brown colour with the pollen that is discharged from the blue waterlilies; when the skirts of the groves are radiant with the flowers of the bandhûka and bâna-trees; when there is the time of the awakening from sleep of (the god) Madhusûdana; (and) when the stars are as pure as a bed of waterlilies in full bloom;— (L. 22.)—He who has adorned (this) city on the banks of the Gargarâ with irrigation wells, tanks, and temples and halls of the gods, drinking-wells, and pleasure-gardens of various kinds, and causeways, and long pools, just as if (he were adorning his own) beloved wife with different sorts of ornaments; he who is, as it were, the third eye of the king; who is of noble behaviour; who is devoted to gods, Brâhmans, spiritual preceptors, relations, and holy men; and who, (by nature) not free from partiality (for thus particular virtue), has (always) applied (his) thoughts to courteous behaviour, destitute of litigation, which is applauded by the sacred writings;— he who, having reflected that the life of every man lasts not for ever and is full of feebleness, and that prosperity is as unstable as a swing, is displaying, by means of (his) lawfully acquired riches, the most extreme devotion towards (the god Vishnu) who bears the discus and the club;— he who has two handsome arms that are muscular and long and round and pendulous; who is [marked] with the wounds of swords; whose eyes stretch to the tips of (his) ears; who is possessed of a clear skin like that of a young woman of tender age; who destroys (his) enemies when they display energy through pride; who is powerful . . . . . . . . . . . . . . . . . . . . . . .; who through devotion behaves like a relation towards (his) enemies; who is experienced in (the combined pursuit, without mutual conflict, of) religion and wealth and pleasure;— (L. 28.)— He, the illustrious Mayûrâkshaka,— who is sprung from a family possessed of wisdom and prowess; whose heroism is renowned in every region; who holds himself under control; (and) who has accomplished, in his son Vishnubhata and also Haribhata, the duty of (continuing his) lineage,— caused to be built by his sons, the favourites of great good fortune, this shrine of the divine (god) Vishnu, which blocks up the path of sin—, seeing the aspect of which, resembling the lofty peak of (the mountain) Kailâsa, the Vidyâdharas, accompanied by their mistresses, come and gaze into it with happy faces that are like waterlilies, as if it were the very lustrous surface of a mirror;— (and) seeing which (aspect), at the moment when the surface (of the roof) has been polished by the palms of the hands of the lovely women of the gods, the sun, who in the sky is praised in chorus by the saints possessed of superhuman power of mind resulting from religious merit, reins in his chariot-horses with (their) tossing manes, which think (from the reflection) that they are returning towards (themselves), and, joining (his hands) together (so that they resemble) an expanding bud in respectful salutation, runs away in fear with bent-down head. (L. 35.)— Also, for the sake of religious merit, the counsellor of the king caused to be built this very terrible abode, . . . . . . . . . . . . . . . . . . . . . . . . (and) filled full of female ghouls, of the divine Mothers, who utter loud and tremendous shouts in joy, (and) who stir up the (very) oceans with the mighty wind rising from the magic rites of their religion. (L. 37.)— And the illustrious Mayûrâkshaka, the receptacle of virtuous qualities, caused to be made this well, which is protected by . . . . . . . . . . . . . . . . .. . . . . . . in the lower regions, resembling serpents; which possesses much water, cool, and sweet, and pure; (and) which rivals the ocean. (L. 39.)— As long as the oceans . . . . . . . . . . . . . . . . . . . . . . . . are full of jewels; as long as the earth, with (its) mountains, abounds with many thickets and trees and woods; and as long as the moon lights up the sky that is inlaid with the host of the planets;— so long let the fame of the illustrious Mayûrâkshaka remain abundant! Let there be success!

== See also ==
- Indian inscriptions
