= Huna people =

5th–6th-century Central Asian tribes that invaded India

Approximate extent of the Alchon Huns, and find spots of inscriptions related to their local control (map of the Indian subcontinent)

Hunas (Middle Brahmi script: Hūṇā) was the name given by the ancient Indians to a group of Central Asian tribes who, via the Khyber Pass, entered the Indian subcontinent at the end of the 5th or early 6th-century. The Hunas occupied areas as far south as Eran and Kosambi, greatly weakening the Gupta Empire. The Hunas were ultimately defeated by a coalition of Indian princes that included an Indian king Yashodharman and the Gupta emperor, Narasimhagupta. They defeated the Alchon Hun army and their ruler Mihirakula in 528 CE and drove them out of India. The Guptas are thought to have played only a minor role in this campaign.

The Hunas included Kidarites (Red Huns) and Alchon Huns, the term was also used to refer to Nezak Huns and Hephthalites (White Huns) who did not enter the Indian subcontinent. These groups were not synonymous though the term Huna refers to these different groups collectively. The relationship of the Hunas to the Huns, a Central Asian people who invaded Europe during the same period, remains disputed.

In its farthest geographical extent in India, the territories controlled by the Hunas covered the region up to Malwa in central India. Their repeated invasions and war losses were the main reason for the decline of the Gupta Empire.

== History ==
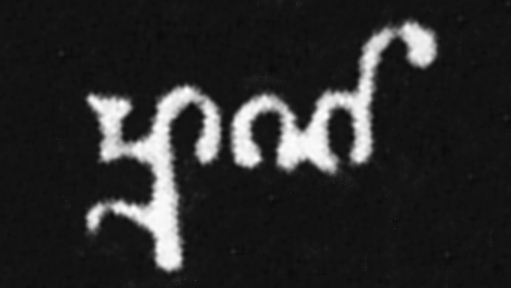
The Indian word "Huna" ( Hūṇā) in line 12 (Verse 16) of the Rīsthal inscription, 6th century CE.

Chinese sources link the Central Asian tribes comprising the Hunas to both the Xiongnu of north east Asia and the Huns who later invaded and settled in Europe. Similarly, Gerald Larson suggests that the Hunas were a Turkic-Mongolic grouping from Central Asia. The works of Ptolemy (2nd-century) are among the first European texts to mention the Huns, followed by the texts by Marcellinus and Priscus. They too suggest that the Huns were an inner Asian people.

The Kidarites, who invaded Bactria in the second half of the 4th century, are generally regarded as the first wave of Hunas to have entered the Indian subcontinent and established principalities in Gandhara and Punjab. The Alchon Huns Huns later vanquished the Kidarites in the Kabul Valley. The Gupta Empire under Skandagupta in the 5th-century successfully repulsed one Alchon Hun attack in the northwest Indian subcontinent in 460 CE. The Alchons conquered the Kidarite principalities in the late 5th and early 6th-century, under Khingila I, after the death of Skandagupta. From there, they fanned out into various parts of northern, western, and central India. The Hūṇas are also mentioned in several ancient Indian literary texts such as the Rāmāyaṇa, Mahābhārata, Purāṇas, and Kalidasa's Raghuvaṃśa.

In 528 CE, another campaign led by a coalition of Indian kings finally defeated the Alchon Hun king Mihirakula. The victory was inscribed on a stone pillar and erected in honor of (and in praise for) one of the leaders of the coalition, king Yashodharman, in Mandasaur in central India.

The original religious beliefs of the Hunas are unknown, and believed to be a combination of ancestor worship, totemism and animism.

== Gallery ==
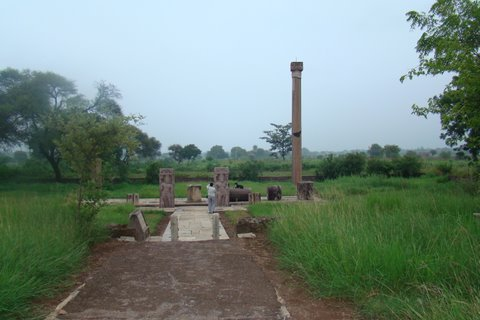
Victory pillar of Yashodharman at Sondani, Mandsaur claiming victory over the Alchon Huns.

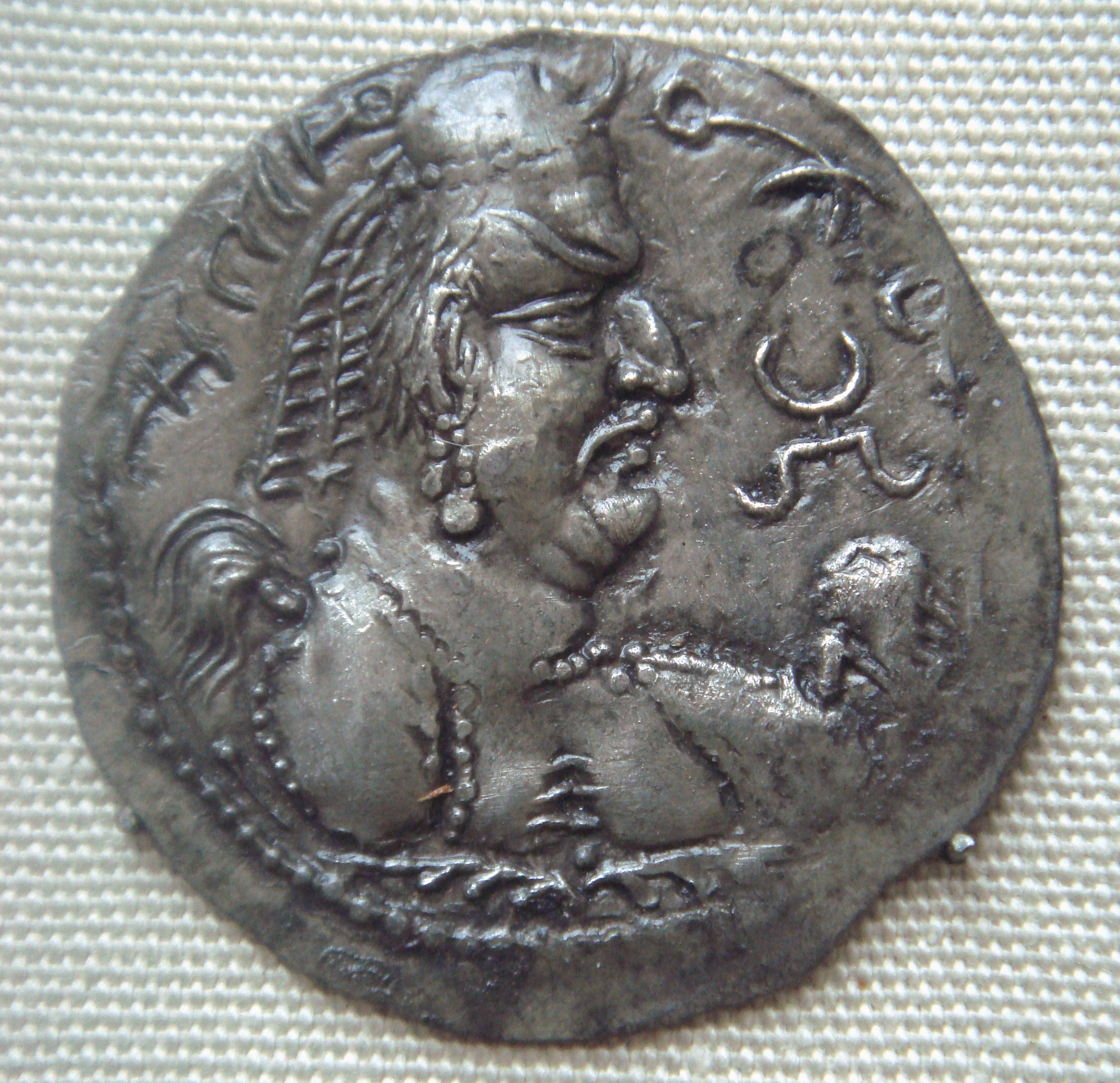
Alchon Hun king Khingila I.

== See also ==
- Hara Huna kingdom
- Origin of the Huns
- Xionites
- Iranian Huns
- Kushan Empire
- Central Asians in ancient Indian literature
