= Mandsaur stone inscription of Yashodharman-Vishnuvardhana =

Sanskrit stone inscripton

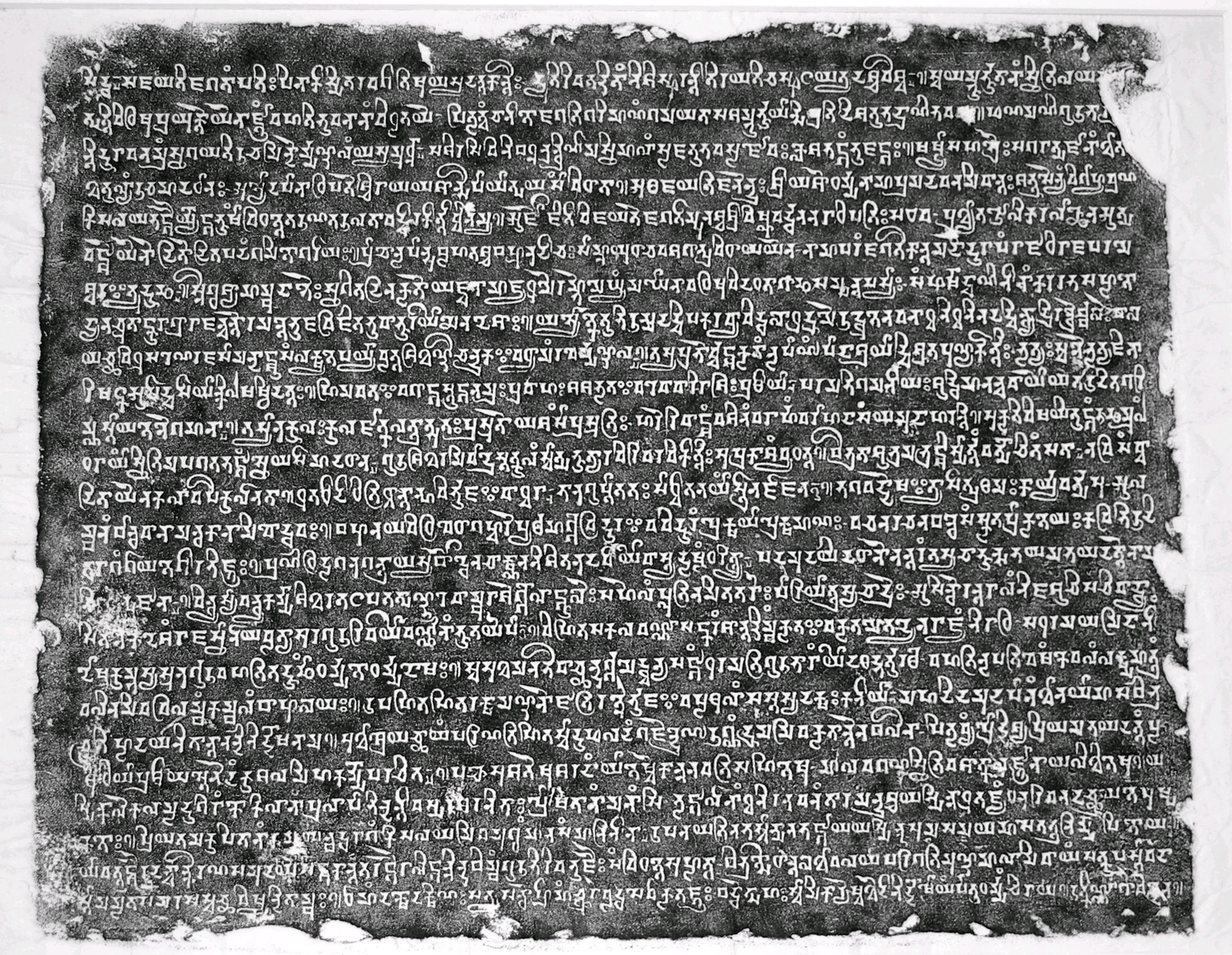
- Mandasor stone inscription of Yashodharman-Vishuvardhana. Actual photograph.
- Material: Stone
- Created: c. 532 CE

Location
- Location of the epigraphic inscription of Mandsaur.

The Mandsaur stone inscription of Yashodharman-Vishnuvardhana, is a Sanskrit inscription in the Gupta script dated to about 532 CE, on a slate stone measuring about 2 feet broad, 1.5 feet high and 2.5 inches thick found in the Malwa region of India, now a large part of the southwestern Madhya Pradesh. On the back are engraved a sign of sun and moon, as well as two horsemen. The inscription opens with the sign for siddham, is entirely in verse of various meters, and is signed at the end with the name of the engraver. The script says Fleet belongs to the "northern class of alphabet", and opens with invocations to Hindu god Shiva.

== Location ==
The inscription was discovered accidentally during repairs of an unknown water well, where the inscription was on concealed side of a block in its wall. It had already been removed from the well when first witnessed by Fleet, but Fleet was unable to determine which and he guessed that it may be the original well may be the ancient one located just inside of the eastern entrance of modern Mandsaur Fort.

== Description ==
The inscription records the construction of a well by a person named Daksha in Dashapura (modern Mandsaur, also often spelled Mandasor and referred to as Dasor). It mentions the rule of Yashodharman. The builder of the well, named Daksha, is described as the younger brother of Dharmadosha, himself a minister of Yashodharman. Daksha built the well in honor of his deceased uncle Abhayadatta, also minister of Yashodharman, in charge of the tract of country between the Vindhyas and the Pariyatra mountain and the "Western Ocean". According to the inscription, Daksha was the grandson of a Brahmin Ravikirtti, whose wife was named Bhanugupta, a Kshatriya. This, states Fleet, means that during this period Brahmin and Kshatriya were intermarrying, something seen in other inscriptions such as the Ghatotkacha cave inscription.

The inscription mentions the victories of local ruler Yasodharman over Northern and Eastern kingdoms, with "peaceful overtures and by war". These kingdoms are not further specified.

=== Fleet's translation of the inscription ===
The inscription was translated by John Faithfull Fleet in Corpus Inscriptionum Indicarum: Inscriptions of the Early Guptas in 1888 (line numbers and paragraph titles are part of the original text):

(Line 1.) "Perfection has been attained! Victorious is he, (the god) Pinakin, the lord of [all] the worlds,— in whose songs, hummed with smiles, the splendor of (his) teeth, like the lustre of lightning sparkling in the night, envelops and brings into full view all this Universe! May he, (the god) Sambhu, confer many auspicious gifts upon you,— employed by whom in the rites of {effecting the} continuance and the destruction and the production of {all} things that exist, (the god) Svayambhu, is obedient to (his) commands, for the sake of the maintenance of (all) the worlds; and by whom, leading (him) to dignity in the world, he has been brought to the condition of being the father (of the universe )! May the serpent of the creator of existence accomplish the allayment of your distress,— (that serpent) the multitude of whose foreheads, bowed down afar by the pressure of the heavy weight of the jewels in (their) hoods, obscures the radiance of the moon (on his master's forehead); (and) who (with the folds of his body) binds securely on [his master’s] head the chaplet of bones which is full of holes (for stringing them)! May the creator of waters, which was dug out by the sixty thousand sons of Sagara, (and) which possesses a lustre equal to (that of) the sky, preserve for a long time the glories of this best of wells!

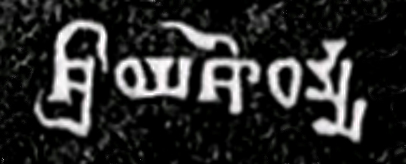
The name Śrī Ya-śo-dha-rmma ("Lord Yashodharman") in Gupta script in Line 4 of the Mandsaur stone inscription of Yashodharman-Vishnuvardhana.

The 532 AD Mandsaur stone inscription of Yashodharman-Vishnuvardhana mentions victorious campaigns against northern kings (probably referring to the victory against the Alchon Huns at Sondani), and against "mighty kings of the east", including a campaign across the Vindhya Range.

(Line 4.)— Now, victorious is that tribal ruler, having the name of the glorious Yashodharman, who, having plunged into the army of (his) enemies, as if into a grove of thornapple-trees, (and) having bent down the reputation of heroes like the tender creepers of trees, effects the adornment of (his) body with the fragments of young sprouts which are the wounds (inflicted on him).

(L. 5.)— And, again, victorious over the earth is this same king of men, the glorious Vishnuvardhana, the conqueror in war; by whom his own famous lineage, which has the Aulikara-crest, has been brought to a state of dignity that is ever higher and higher. By him, having brought into subjection, with peaceful overtures and by war, the mighty kings of the east and many (kings) of the north, this second name of "Supreme King of Kings and Supreme Lord", pleasing in the world (but) difficult of attainment, is carried on high.

Through him, having conquered the earth with (his own) arm, many countries, — in which the sun is obscured by the smoke, resembling dense dark-blue clouds, of the oblations of the sacrifices; (and) which abound with thick and-thriving crops through (the god) Maghavan pouring cloudfuls of rain upon (their) boundaries; (and) in which the ends of the fresh sprouts of the mango-trees in the parks are eagerly plucked in joy by the hands of wanton women,— enjoy the happiness of being possessed of a good king.

Through the dust, grey like the hide of an ass,— stirred up by his armies, which have (their) banners lifted on high; (and) which have the lodhra-trees tossed about in all directions by the tusks of (their) infuriated elephants; (and) which have the crevices of the Vindhya mountains made resonant with the noise of (their) journeying through the forests, — the orb of the sun appears dark (and) dull-rayed, as if it were an eye in a peacock's tail reversed.

(L. 9.) — The servant of the kings who founded the family of that lord, was Shashthidatta,— the fame of whose religious merit was known far and wide through the protection of their feet; who by his resoluteness conquered the six enemies (of religion) (and) who was indeed very excellent. As the torrent, flowing high and low, of (the river) Ganga (spreads abroad) from (the mountain) Himavat, (and) the extensive mass of the waters of (the river) Reva from the moon,— (so) from him, whose dignity was manifested, there spreads a pure race of Naigamas most worthy to be sought in fellowship.

(L. 11.)— Of him, from a wife of good family, there was born a son, resembling him (in good qualities), the source of fame,— whom, being named Varahadasa, (and) being full of self-control (and) of great worth, people speak of as if he were an (incarnate) portion of (the god) Hari.

(L. 12.)— As if it were the sun (illumining) the mighty summit of a mountain, Ravikirtti with the wealth of his character illumined that family, which was made eminent by men who combined good actions with worldly occupations; which had its foundations well established in the earth; (and) which maintained a very firm position of endurance that was free from (any risk of) being broken (Ravikirtti), by whom, sustaining the pure (and) undeviating path of traditional law that is acceptable to good people, nobility of birth was not made a thing of false assertion (even) in the Kali age. From him, (his) chaste wife Bhanugupta gave birth to three sons, who dispelled the darkness (of ignorance) with the rays of (their) intellects,— as if (she had produced three) sacrifices from a fire.

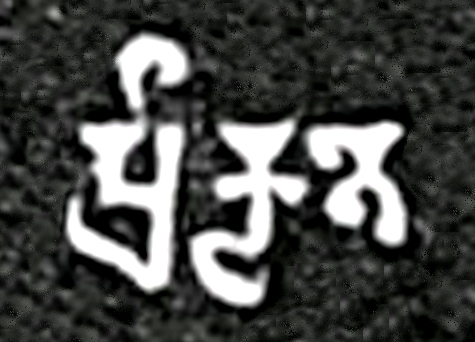
Word for "Prakrit" (here Prā-kṛ-te) in Gupta script in the inscription.

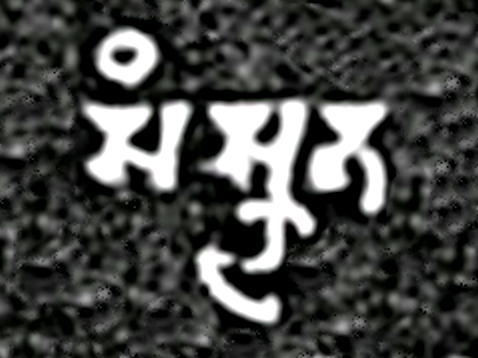
An early use of the word for "Sanskrit" in Gupta script: Saṃ-skṛ-ta

(L. 13-14)— The first was Bhagavaddosha, the prop of his relatives in the paths of religious actions, just as Uddhava (was) of the Andhakas,-— who was a very Vedhas in displaying much prudence in the hard-to-be-traversed path of the meaning (of words ); who, like Vidura, always looked far ahead with deliberation; (and) who is with great pleasure sung by the poets, in Sanskrit and Prakrit construction of the arrangement of sentences, as well as well-versed in speech.

(L. 15.)— And after him there came that (well-known) Abhayadatta, maintaining a high position on the earth, (and) collecting (in order to dispel it) the fear of (his) subjects (?) Before the eye of intellect, which served him like the eyes of a spy, no trifle, however remained undetected, (even) at night.-— (Abhayadatta), of fruitful actions, who like (Bubaspati) the preceptor of the gods, to the advantage of those who belonged to the (four recognised) castes, with the functions of a Rajasthaniya (viceroy) protected the region, containing many countries presided over by his own uprights counselors, which lies between the Vindhya (mountains), from the slopes of the summits of which there flows the pale mass of the waters of (the river) Reva, and the mountain Pariyatra, on which the trees are bent down in (they) frolicsome leaps by the long-tailed monkeys, (and stretches) up to the (western) Ocean.

(L. 17.)- Now he, Dharmadosha, the son of Doshakumbha, by whom this kingdom has been made as if (it were still) in 'the Krita-age, free from any intermixture of all the castes, (and peaceable through) having hostilities allayed, (and) undisturbed by care, in accordance with justice proudly supports the burden (of government) that had previously been borne by him (Dharmadosha), who,— not being too eager about his own comfort, (and) bearing, for the sake of his lord, in the difficult path (of administration), the burden (of government), very heavily weighted and not shared by another, wears royal apparel only as mark of distinction (and not for his own pleasure), just as a bull carries a wrinkled pendulous dew-lap.

(L. 19.) His young brother Daksha, invested with the decoration of the protection of friends, as if he were (his) broad-shouldered (right) arm (decorated) with choice jewels; (and) bearing the name of the faultless one which causes great joy to the ear and heart,— caused to be excavated this great well. This great (and) skillful work was achieved here by him, who is of great intellect, for the sake of his paternal uncle, the beloved Abhayadatta, who was cut off (before his time) by the mighty god Kritanta just as if he were a tree, the shade of which is pleasant to resort to (and) which yields fruits that are salutary and sweet through ripeness, (wantonly) destroyed by a lordly elephant.

(L. 21.)— Five hundred autumns, together with ninety less by one, having elapsed from (the establishment of) the supremacy of the tribal constitution of the Malavas (and) being written down in order to determine the (present) time,— in the season in which the songs, resembling the arrows of (the god) Smara, of the cuckoos, whose utterances are low and tender, cleave open, as it were, the minds of those who are far away from home; and in which the humming of the flights of bees sounding low on account of the burden (that they carry), is heard through the woods, like the resounding bow of (the god Kamadeva) who has the banner of flowers, when its string is caused to vibrate in the season in which there is the month of the coming on of flowers, when the wind, soothing the affectionate (but) perverted thoughts of disdainful women who are angry with their lovers, as if they were charming fresh sprouts arrayed in colors, devotes itself to breaking down (their) pride,— in that season this (well) was caused to be constructed.

(L. 24.) — As long as the ocean, embracing with (its) lofty waves, as if with long arms, the orb of the moon, which has its full assemblage of rays (and is more) lovely (than ever) from contact (with the water), maintains friendship (with it),—so long let this excellent well endure, possessing a surrounding enclosure of lines at the edge of the masonry-work, as if it were a garland worn round a shaven head, (and) discharging pure waters the flavor of which is equal to nectar!

(L. 25.)— May this intelligent Daksha for a long time protect this act of piety, (he who is) skillful, true to (his) promises, modest, brave, attentive to old people, grateful, full of energy, unwearied in the business-matters of (his) lord, (and) faultless. I (This eulogy) has been engraved by Govinda."

— Translator: John Fleet, Mandsaur stone inscription of Yashodharman-Vishnuvardhana
