= Mandsaur Lok Sabha constituency =

Lok Sabha Constituency in Gujarat, India

Coordinates: 24.07°N 75.06°E

Mandsaur
- Lok Sabha constituency
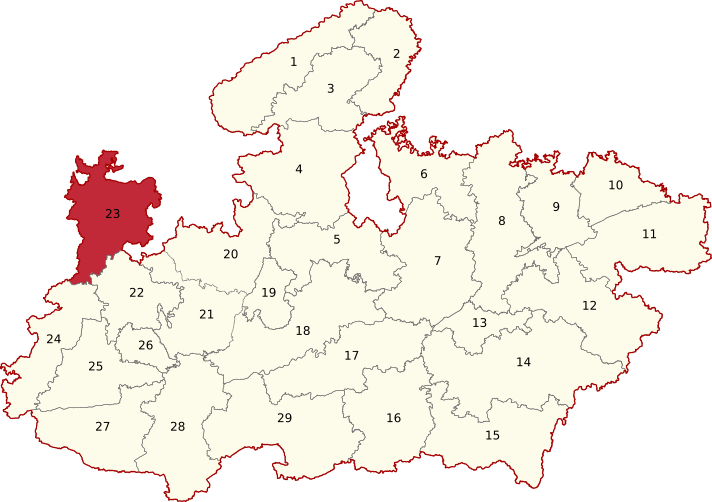
- Mandsaur Lok Sabha constituency within Madhya Pradesh

Constituency details
- Country: India
- Region: Central India
- State: Madhya Pradesh
- Assembly constituencies: Jaora; Mandsaur; Malhargarh; Suwasra; Garoth; Manasa; Neemuch; Jawad
- Established: 1952
- Reservation: None

Member of Parliament
- 18th Lok Sabha
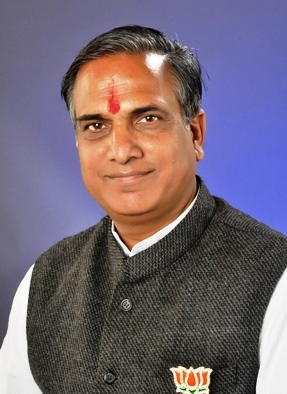
- Incumbent Sudhir Gupta
- Party: Bharatiya Janata Party
- Elected year: 2024

Mandsaur Lok Sabha constituency is one of the 29 Lok Sabha constituencies in the Indian state of Madhya Pradesh. This constituency covers the entire Mandsaur and Neemuch districts and part of Ratlam district.

== Assembly segments ==
Presently, Mandsaur Lok Sabha constituency comprises the following eight Vidhan Sabha (Legislative Assembly) segments:

#	Name	District	Member	Party	2024 Lead
222	Jaora	Ratlam	Rajendra Pandey	BJP	BJP
224	Mandsaur	Mandsaur	Vipin Jain	INC	BJP
225	Malhargarh (SC)	Mandsaur	Jagdish Devda	BJP	BJP
226	Suwasra	Mandsaur	Hardeepsing Dung	BJP	BJP
227	Garoth	Mandsaur	Chandar Singh Sisodiya	BJP	BJP
228	Manasa	Neemuch	Anirudhh Maroo	BJP	BJP
229	Neemuch	Neemuch	Dilip Singh Parihar	BJP	BJP
230	Jawad	Neemuch	Omprakash Sakhlecha	BJP	BJP

== Members of Parliament ==
Year	Member	Party
1952	Kailash Nath Katju	Indian National Congress
1957	Manakbhai Agrawal	Indian National Congress
1962	Umashankar Trivedi	Bharatiya Jana Sangh
1967	Swatantra Singh Kothari	Bharatiya Jana Sangh
1971	Laxminarayan Pandey	Bharatiya Jana Sangh
1977	Laxminarayan Pandey	Janata Party
1980	Bhanwarlal Nahata	Indian National Congress (I)
1984	Balkavi Bairagi	Indian National Congress
1989	Laxminarayan Pandey	Bharatiya Janata Party
1991	Laxminarayan Pandey	Bharatiya Janata Party
1996	Laxminarayan Pandey	Bharatiya Janata Party
1998	Laxminarayan Pandey	Bharatiya Janata Party
1999	Laxminarayan Pandey	Bharatiya Janata Party
2004	Laxminarayan Pandey	Bharatiya Janata Party
2009	Meenakshi Natarajan	Indian National Congress
2014	Sudhir Gupta	Bharatiya Janata Party
2019	Sudhir Gupta	Bharatiya Janata Party
2024	Sudhir Gupta	Bharatiya Janata Party

== Election results ==
=== 2024 ===
2024 Indian general election: Mandsaur
Party	Candidate	Votes	%	±%
BJP	Sudhir Gupta	945,761	65.98	+4.13
INC	Dilip Singh Gurjar	445,106	31.05	−3.32
NOTA	None of the above	11,162	0.81	+0.12
Majority		500,655	34.93	+7.09
Turnout		1,433,492	75.27	−2.62
BJP hold		Swing		

=== 2019 ===
2019 Indian general elections: Mandsaur
Party	Candidate	Votes	%	±%
BJP	Sudhir Gupta	847,786	61.85	+1.72
INC	Meenakshi Natarajan	471,052	34.37	+0.38
BSP	Prabhulal Meghwal	9,703	0.71	new
NOTA	None of the above	9,431	0.69	−0.05
Majority		376,734	27.84	+1.69
Turnout		1,371,535	77.89	+6.75
BJP hold		Swing		

=== General Elections 2014 ===
2014 Indian general elections: Mandsaur
Party	Candidate	Votes	%	±%
BJP	Sudhir Gupta	698,335	60.13	+15.36
INC	Meenakshi Natarajan	394,686	33.99	−14.81
AAP	Paras Saklecha Dada	10,183	0.88	new
NOTA	None of the above	8,568	0.74	N/A
Majority		303,649	26.15	+22.12
Turnout		1,161,599	71.41	+15.58
BJP gain from INC		Swing		

=== General Elections 2009 ===
2009 Indian general elections: Mandsaur
Party	Candidate	Votes	%	±%
INC	Meenakshi Natarajan	373,532	48.80	
BJP	Laxminarayan Pandey	342,713	44.77	
Majority		30,819	4.03	
Turnout		765,476	55.83	
INC gain from BJP		Swing		

== See also ==
- Mandsaur district
- Neemuch district
- List of constituencies of the Lok Sabha
