= Meenakshi Natarajan =

Indian politician

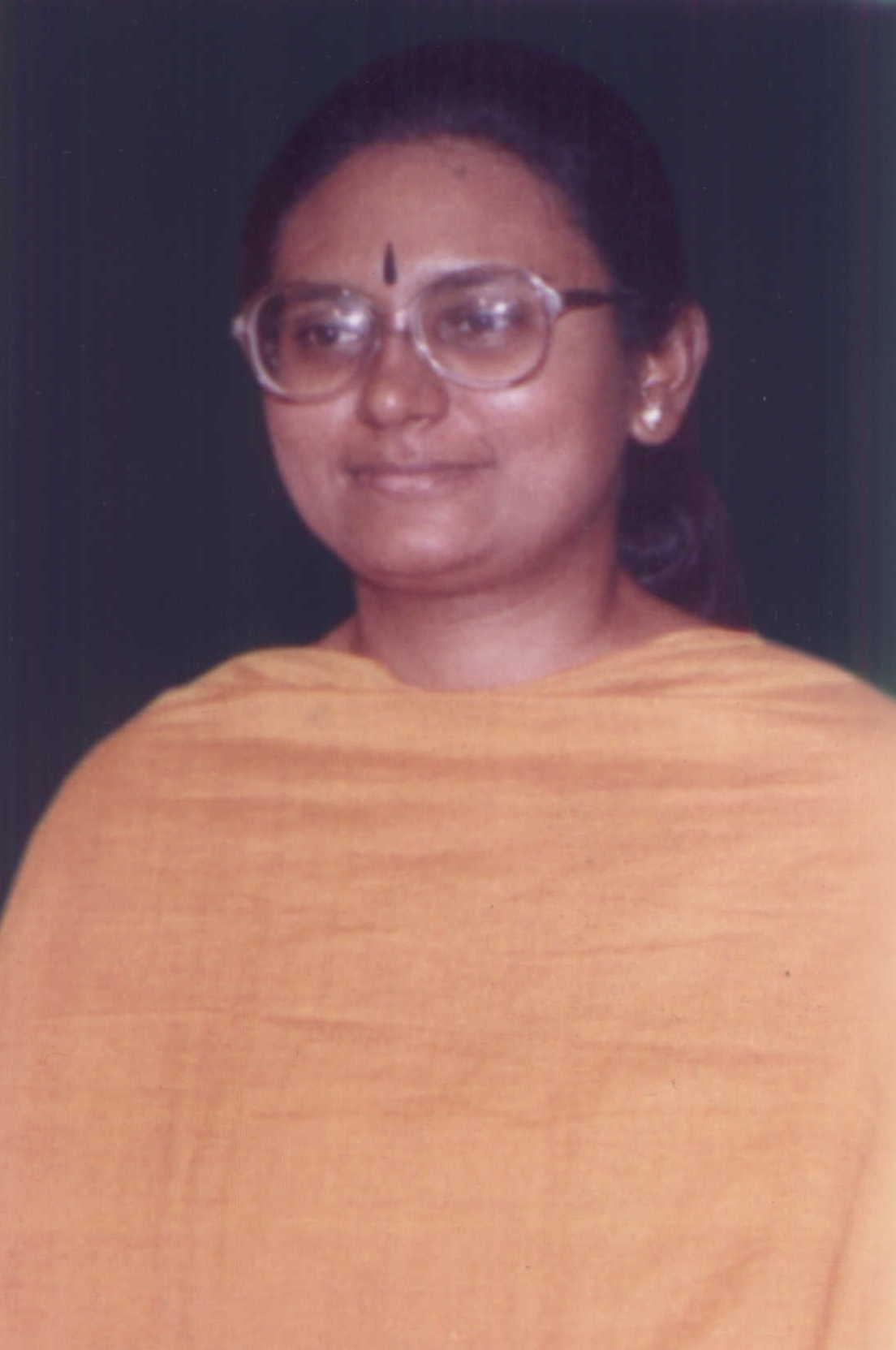
- Meenakshi Natarajan, Member of Parliament of India from Mandsaur

AICC Incharge for Telangana Pradesh Congress Committee
- In office 14 February 2025 – 14 November 2026
- Preceded by: Deepa Dasmunsi
- Succeeded by: B. M. Sandeep

Member of Parliament, 15th Lok Sabha
- In office 2009–2014
- Preceded by: Laxminarayan Pandey
- Succeeded by: Sudhir Gupta
- Constituency: Mandsaur

President of National Students' Union of India
- In office 1999–2003
- Preceded by: Alka Lamba
- Succeeded by: Ashok Tanwar

Personal details
- Born: 23 July 1973 (age 53) Nagda, Madhya Pradesh, India
- Party: Indian National Congress
- Education: Govt. Holkar Science College, Indore; Devi Ahilya Vishwavidyalaya, Indore
- As of 9 December, 2012 Source: []

Meenakshi Natarajan (born 23 July 1973) is an Indian politician and former Member of Parliament from Mandsaur from 2009 to 2014, her single term in parliament.

She was appointed as AICC Telangana in-charge on 14 February 2025.

Natarajan has been nominated along with six others in the list for Rajya Sabha by-elections in June 2026.

== Background ==
Meenakshi Natarajan was born in Birlagram Nagda, Ujjain in Madhya Pradesh in a Tamil family. She is a post graduate in Biochemistry and has a bachelor's degree in Law. She completed her study in Indore, Madhya Pradesh from Devi Ahilya University. Ratlam was the place where she started her political career after joining NSUI. She is writer of "1857-Bhartiya Paripeksh" "Apne-Apne Kurukshetra" is her popular novel.

== Political career ==
=== Organisational roles ===
She worked as NSUI President from 1999–2002. She also worked as President Madhya Pradesh Youth Congress from 2002–2005 and was selected by Rahul Gandhi as AICC Secretary in 2008.

=== 2009 Elections ===
She was selected by Rahul Gandhi for contesting from Mandsaur, Madhya Pradesh in 2009 Indian general election which she won by over 30,000 votes defeating her BJP opponent Laxminarayan Pandey who had been winning since 1971 (except in 1980 and 1984, when he lost to the Congress candidates). She had coined the slogan "Pradesh elections".

She has served as a Member of the Committee on Personnel, Public Grievances, Law and Justice and that of the Committee on Empowerment of Women.

=== 2014 Elections ===
She was defeated by Sudhir Gupta of the Bharatiya Janata Party (BJP) from the Mandsaur constituency in Madhya Pradesh by a margin of over 300,000 votes. She had emerged as a 'consensus candidate' through the primary, which is piloted by Congress vice-president Rahul Gandhi. Her opponent Surendra Sethi has alleged that the primary was rigged.

=== 2019 Elections ===
She contested the Mandsaur seat again in 2019 Indian general election but lost to Sudhir Gupta in a repeat of 2014 result.

=== 2026 Rajya Sabha Elections ===
Natarajan was made Congress Candidate for Rajya Sabha elections in June 2026. The Returning Officer rejected her nomination on the plea that she had hidden details in her nomination papers about a criminal case pending against her in Telangana, calling it a violation of section 33 of the Representation of People's Act 1951.

Natrajan moved to the Election Commission, which took no decision in the matter. This led Natrajan to file a Petition before the Supreme Court, but the Supreme Court rejected the Petition, calling it non-maintainable as being barred under Article 329. The Supreme Court asked her to file an Election Petition, as prescribed by law.

Natrajan and Congress have called the Election Commission's action as being completely against the Constitution.

== Controversy ==
During one of the election rally, her party's spokesperson Digvijaya Singh referred her as "sau taka tunch maal" (100% pure material or totally unblemished) while introducing her on the stage.

On 11 June 2026, Natarajan filed her nomination as the Indian National Congress candidate for the Rajya Sabha election from Madhya Pradesh. During scrutiny of nomination papers, the Returning Officer rejected her nomination, citing alleged non-disclosure of a pending court case in the nomination affidavit. The Indian National Congress disputed the decision and indicated that it would challenge the rejection.
