= Tej Bahadur Singh Chauhan =

Indian politician (born 1968)

Tej Bahadur Singh Chauhan (born 1968) is an Indian politician from Madhya Pradesh. He is an MLA from Nagda Khachrod Assembly constituency in Ujjain District. He won the 2023 Madhya Pradesh Legislative Assembly election, representing the Bharatiya Janata Party.

== Early life and education ==
Chauhan is from Nagda Khachrod, Ujjain District, Madhya Pradesh. He is the son of Noubat Singh Chouhan. He completed his M.A. in 1988 at Bhopal University, Bhopal. Earlier, he did B.H.M.S. in 1986 at a college affiliated with the State Council of Homeopathy M.P. Bhopal.

== Career ==
Chauhan won from Nagda Khachrod Assembly constituency representing Bharatiya Janata Party in the 2023 Madhya Pradesh Legislative Assembly election. He polled 93,552 votes and defeated his nearest rival, Dilip Singh Gurjar of the Indian National Congress, by a narrow margin of 15,927 votes.
