= Sudhir Gupta =

Indian politician

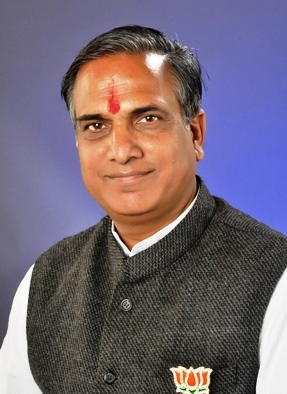

Member of Parliament, Lok Sabha
- Incumbent
- Assumed office 16 May 2014
- Preceded by: Meenakshi Natarajan
- Constituency: Mandsaur

Personal details
- Born: 19 May 1959 (age 67) Mandsaur, Madhya Pradesh, India
- Party: Bharatiya Janta Party
- Spouse: Sadhna Gupta
- Parents: Ramchandra Gupta (father); Durgabai Gupta (mother)
- Education: M.Com, Vikram University
- Profession: Politician, Businessperson

Sudhir Gupta (born 19 May 1959; Hindi pronunciation: [sʊd̪ʱiːɾ gʊpt̪aː]) is an Indian politician and member of the Bharatiya Janata Party. He is currently a member of parliament, having been elected thrice, in 2014, 2019, and 2024 to the Lok Sabha election from Mandsaur constituency in Madhya Pradesh.

In 2024 Lok Sabha Election Gupta again won with a margin of 500,655 votes. He defeated INC's Dilip Singh Gurjar.

== Early life ==
Gupta was born and raised in Mandsaur. His father, Ramchandra Gupta, was an prominent businessman of Mandsaur. He joined the Rashtriya Swayamsevak Sangh organisation and was an active member of Bharatiya Janata Yuva Morcha.

== Career ==
After completing his education, Gupta worked at a co-operative bank in Mandsaur. He also worked as a Life Insurance Corporation of India representative. As an office worker for Vishva Hindu Parishad, he participated in the Ram Janmbhoomi Movement and was arrested in the Etawah district of Uttar Pradesh.

He has been associated with Akhil Bhartiya Vaishy Mahasammelan, the Chamber of Commerce, Mandsaur Judo Parishad and the Bharat Vikas Parishad. He has worked as a Saraswati Shishu Mandir administrator.

He was nominated for membership of the Committee on Estimate, the Standing Committees of the Ministry of Commerce, and in the Ministry of Chemicals and Fertilizers in the Government of India.
