= Mandsaur Fort =

Fortification in India

Mandasor Fort
- Mandasor Fort
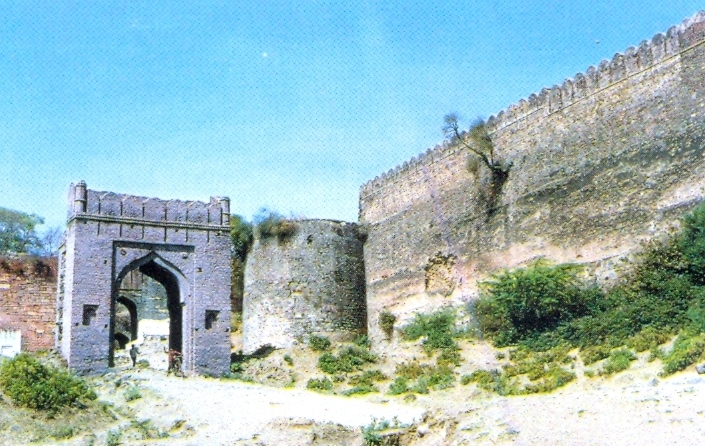
- Mandasor Fort

- Location within India Location within Madhya Pradesh
- 24.062964°N 75.076642°E
- Type: Fort building
- Location: Mandsaur (Madhya Pradesh)

Mandsaur Fort (also known as Dashpur Fort), is situated in Mandsaur city in Mandsaur district in Indian state of Madhya Pradesh.

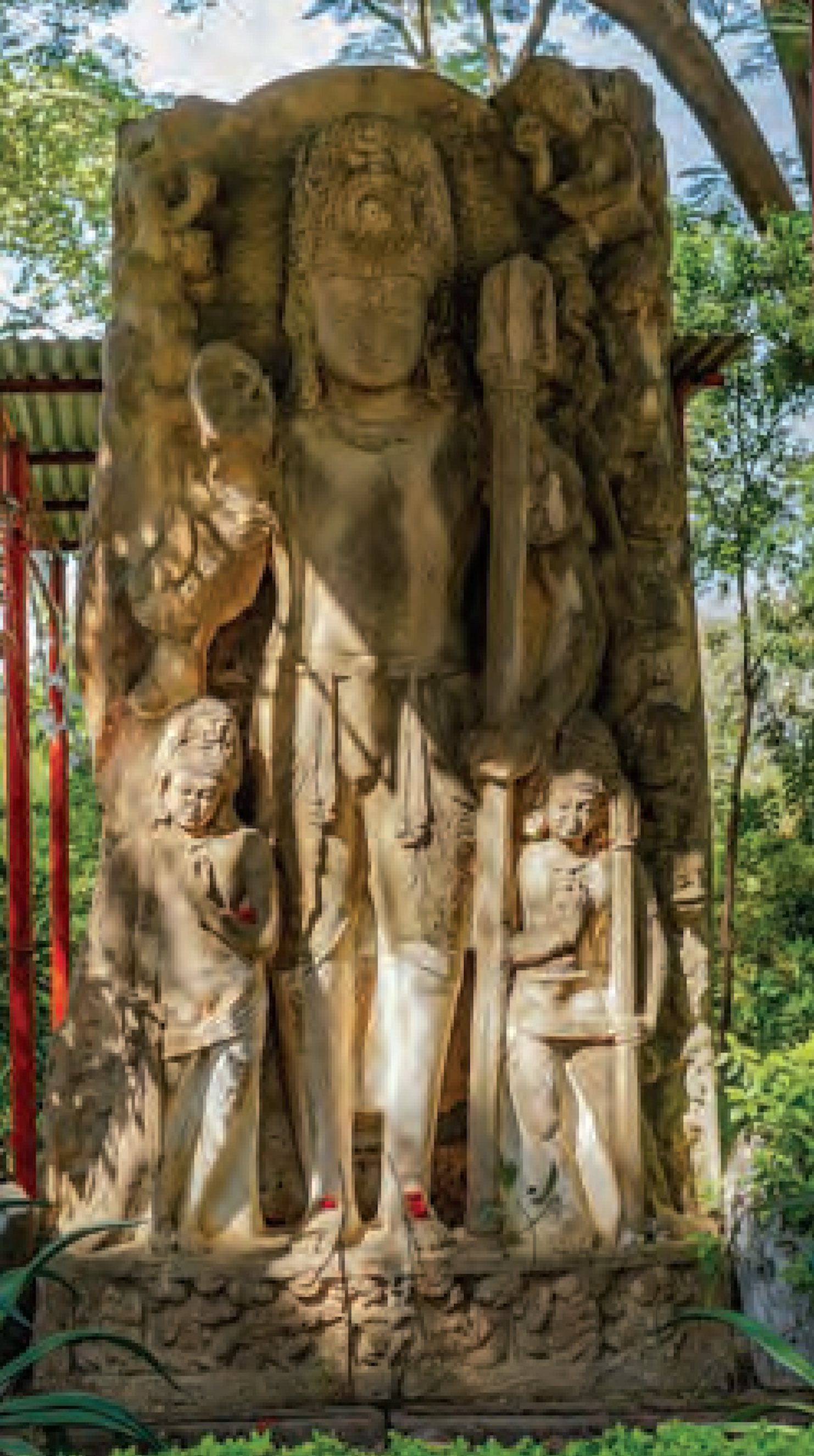
Prakasheshvara statue in Mandasor Fort

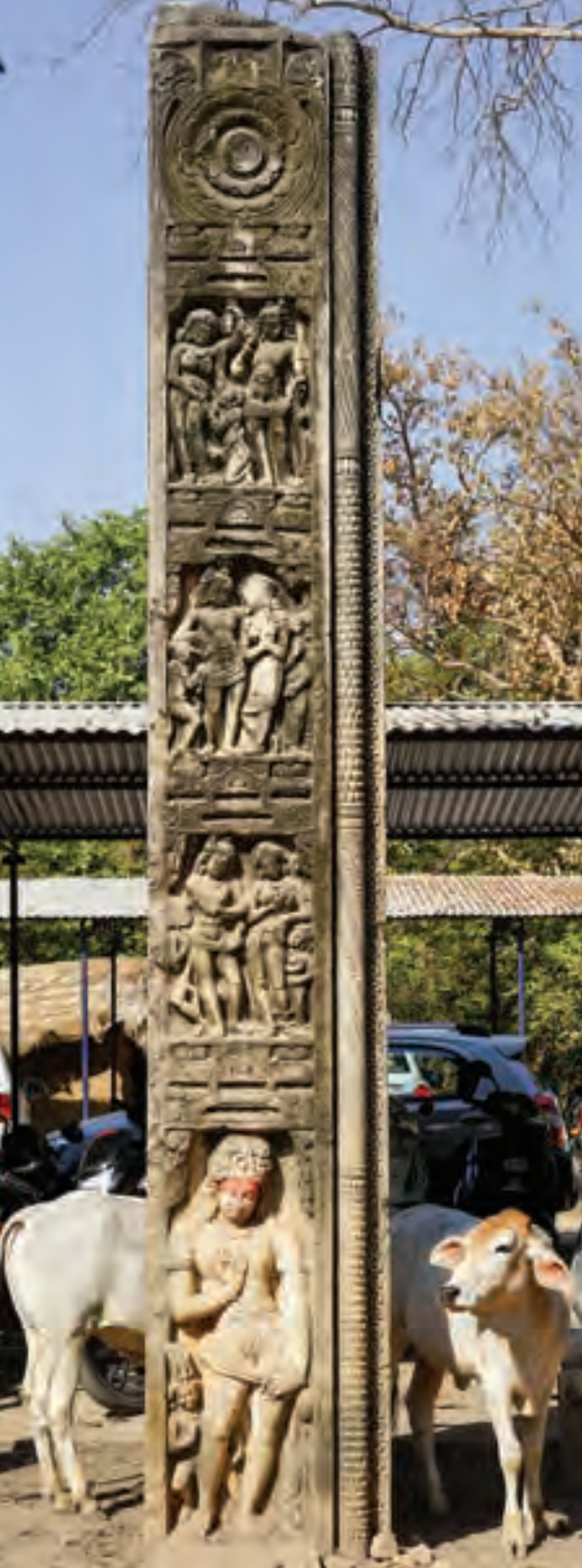
Khilchipura post, now in Mandasor Fort
