= Yashodharman =

6th century emperor of Malwa in India

- Naradhipati; Rajadhiraja
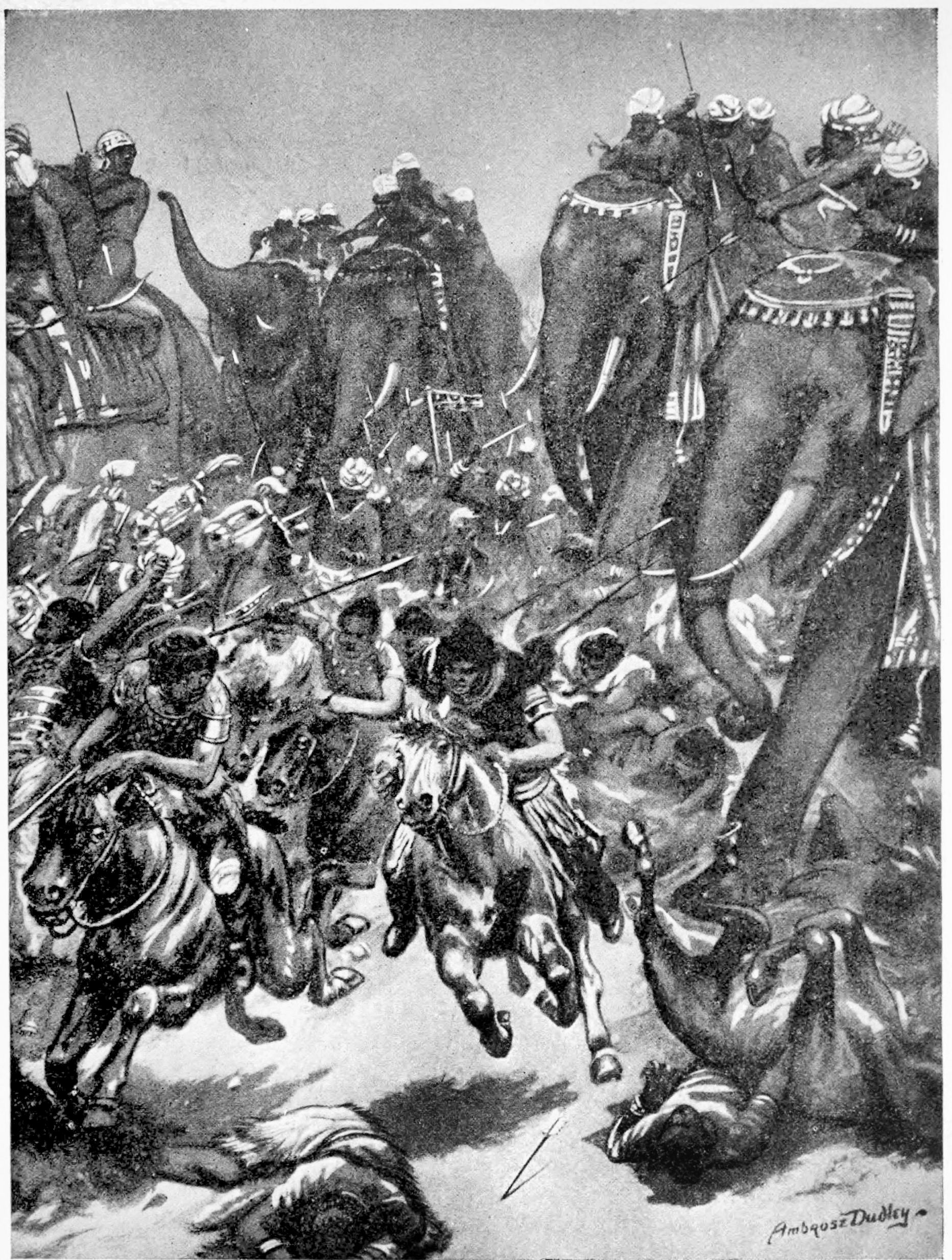
- The defeat of the Alchon Huns of Mihirakula by king Yashodharman at Sondani in 528 AD (early 20th century depiction).

Emperor of Malwa
- Reign: 515–545
- Predecessor: Prakashadharma
- Successor: possibly Dravyavardhana
- House: Second Aulikara dynasty
- Religion: Hinduism

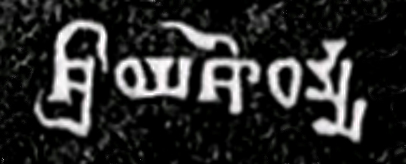
The name Śrī Yaśodharmma ("Lord Yashodharman") in Gupta script in Line 4 of the Mandsaur stone inscription of Yashodharman-Vishnuvardhana.

Yashodharman (Gupta script: Ya-śo-dha-rmma, IAST: Yaśodharman) was a ruler of the Malava Empire in North India, from 515 until his death in 545. He belonged to the Second Aulikara dynasty. He conquered much of the Indian subcontinent between c. 530–540 according to the Mandsaur pillar inscription.

== Reign ==
Towards the end of the 5th century, India came under attack from the Hunas. Yashodharman and possibly the Gupta emperor, Narasimhagupta, defeated a Huna army and their ruler Mihirakula in 528 AD and drove them out of India.

Three inscriptions of Yasodharman have been found in Mandsaur. One of these, the Mandsaur stone inscription of Yashodharman-Vishnuvardhana is of samvat 589 (532 AD).

=== Mandsaur stone inscription of Yashodharman-Vishnuvardhana (532 AD) ===
The 532 AD Mandsaur stone inscription of Yashodharman-Vishnuvardhana mentions victorious campaigns against northern kings (probably referring to the victory against the Alchon Huns at Sondani), and against "mighty kings of the east", including a campaign across the Vindhya Range.

The Mandsaur stone inscription of Yashodharman-Vishnuvardhana was written in 532 AD, and records the construction of a well by a person named Daksha in Dashapura (modern Mandsaur, also often spelled Mandasor), during the rule of Yashodharman. The inscription mentions the victories of local ruler Yasodharman and Vishnuvardhan over Northern and Eastern kingdoms. These kingdoms are not further specified, but it is known that Yashodhaman occupied most of the territories of the Alchon Huns or Hunas to the north, and most of the territories of the Gupta Empire to the east following his victories. Only one more Gupta inscription is known after that date, a land grant in the area of Kotivarsha (Bangarh in West Bengal) by the last Gupta emperor Vishnugupta. The victory against the Alchons Huns is also described in the Mandsaur pillar inscription of Yashodharman.

"(L. 5.)— And, again, victorious over the earth is this same king of men, the glorious Vishnuvardhana, the conqueror in war; by whom his own famous lineage, which has the Aulikara-crest, has been brought to a state of dignity that is ever higher and higher. By him, having brought into subjection, with peaceful overtures and by war, the mighty kings of the east and many (kings) of the north, this second name of "Supreme King of Kings and Supreme Lord", pleasing in the world (but) difficult of attainment, is carried on high."

— Mandsaur stone inscription of Yashodharman and Vishnuvardhana

=== Mandsaur pillar inscription of Yashodharman (515–550 AD) ===
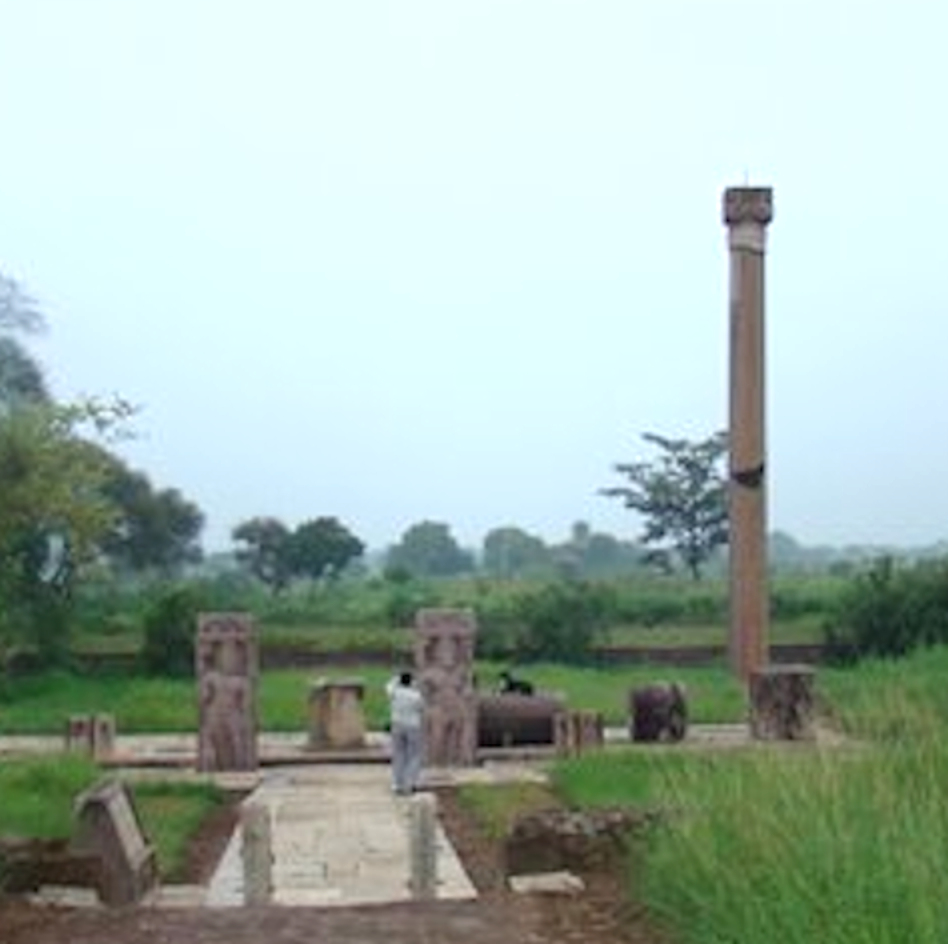
Victory pillar of Yashodharman at Sondani, Mandsaur.

In the Mandsaur pillar inscription, Yashodharman claims he now controls the territory from the neighbourhood of Lauhitya (Brahmaputra River) to the "Western Ocean" (Western Indian Ocean), and from the Himalayas to mountain Mahendra. He also claims he defeated the Hunas at Sondani.

Twin monolithic pillars at Sondani in Mandsaur District were erected by Yasodharman as a record of his victory. In a part of the Sondani inscription, Yasodharman thus praises himself for having defeated king Mihirakula:

"He (Yasodharman) to whose two feet respect was paid, with complimentary presents of the flowers from the lock of hair on the top of (his) head, by even that (famous) king Mihirakula, whose forehead was pained through being bent low down by the strength of (his) arm in (the act of compelling) obeisance"

— Mandsaur pillar inscription of Yashodharman

== Territory ==
In Line 5 of the Mandsaur pillar inscription, Yashodharman claims he vanquished his enemies and now controls the territory from the neighbourhood of the (river) Lauhitya (Brahmaputra River) to the "Western Ocean" (Western Indian Ocean), and from the Himalayas to mountain Mahendra.

Yashodharman thus conquered vast territories from the Hunas and the Guptas, although his short-lived empire would ultimately disintegrate between c. 530–540 AD.
