= Gupta script =

Script system used to write Sanskrit

Gupta script (Late Brahmi script)
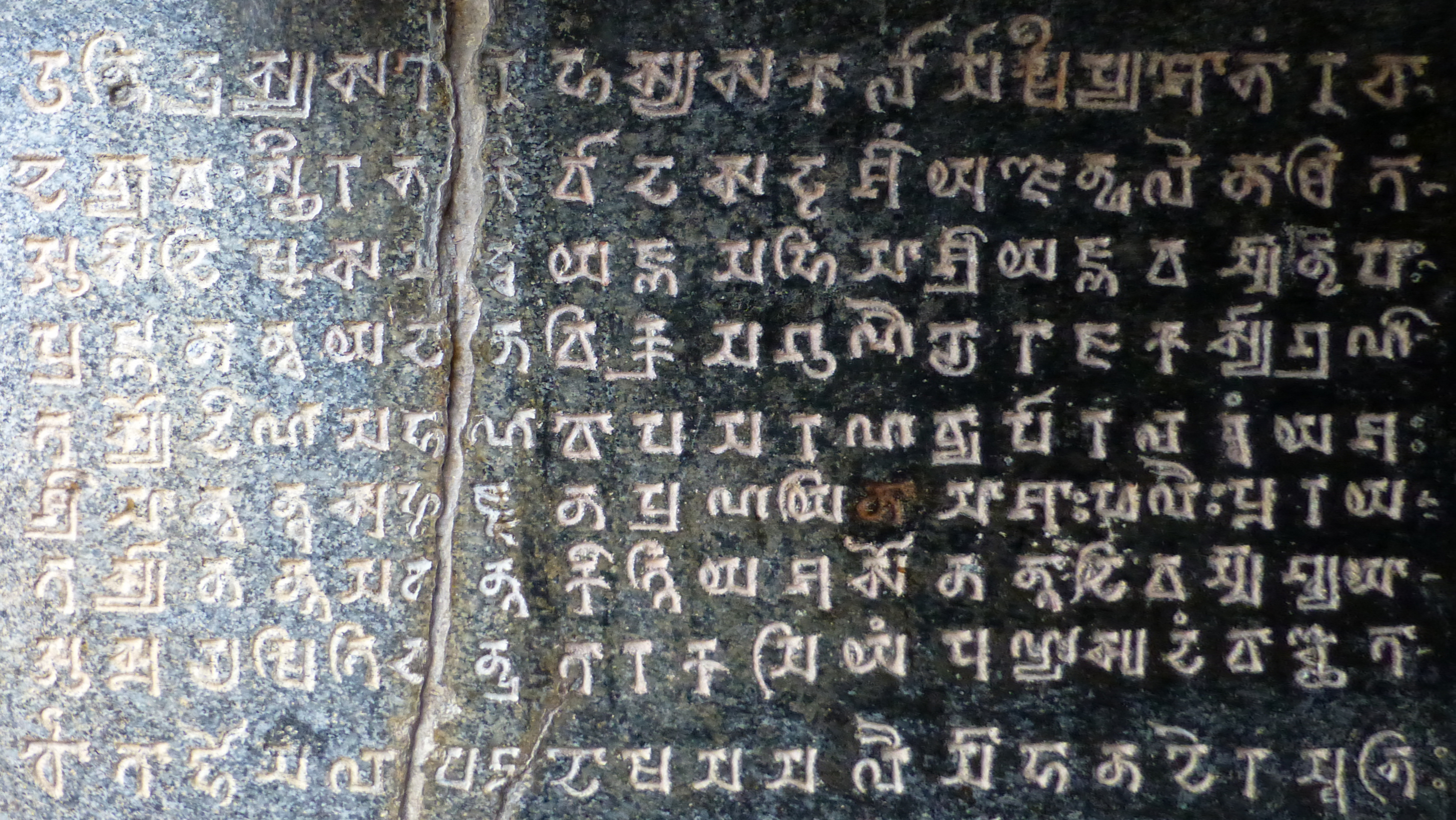
- The Gopika Cave Inscription of Anantavarman, in the Sanskrit language and using the Gupta script. Barabar Caves in Jehanabad Bihar, 5th or 6th century CE.
- Script type: Abugida
- Period: c. 4th–6th century CE
- Direction: Left-to-right
- Languages: Sanskrit, Tibetan

Related scripts
- Parent systems: Egyptian hieroglyphs: Proto-Sinaitic; Phoenician; Aramaic (debated); Brahmi; Northern Brahmi; Gupta script (Late Brahmi script)
- Child systems: Sharada; Siddham; Meitei; Tibetan; Kalinga; Bhaiksuki
- Sister systems: Pallava script, Kadamba script, Tocharian

The Gupta script (sometimes referred to as Gupta Brahmi script or Late Brahmi script) was used for writing Sanskrit and is associated with the Gupta Empire of the Indian subcontinent, which was a period of material prosperity and great religious and scientific developments. The Gupta script was descended from Brāhmī and gave rise to the Śāradā and Siddhaṃ scripts. These scripts in turn gave rise to many of the most important Indic scripts, including Devanāgarī (the most common script used for writing Sanskrit since the 19th century), the Gurmukhī script for Punjabi, the Odia script, the Bengali-Assamese script and the Tibetan script.

== Origins and classification ==
The Gupta script was descended from the Ashokan Brāhmī script, and is a crucial link between Brahmi and most other Brahmic scripts, a family of alphasyllabaries or abugidas. This means that while only consonantal phonemes have distinct symbols, vowels are marked by diacritics, with /a/ being the implied pronunciation when the diacritic is not present. In fact, the Gupta script works in exactly the same manner as its predecessor and successors, and only the shapes and forms of the graphemes and diacritics are different.

Through the 4th century, letters began to take more cursive and symmetric forms, as a result of the desire to write more quickly and aesthetically. This also meant that the script became more differentiated throughout the Empire, with regional variations which have been broadly classified into three, four or five categories; However, a definitive classification is lacking, because even in a single inscription, there may be variations in how a particular symbol is written. In this sense, the term Gupta script should be taken to mean any script derived from the Gupta period, despite a lack of uniformity.

Evolution of the Brahmi script
	k-	kh-	g-	gh-	ṅ-	c-	ch-	j-	jh-	ñ-	ṭ-	ṭh-	ḍ-	ḍh-	ṇ-	t-	th-	d-	dh-	n-	p-	ph-	b-	bh-	m-	y-	r-	l-	v-	ś-	ṣ-	s-	h-
Ashoka	𑀓	𑀔	𑀕	𑀖	𑀗	𑀘	𑀙	𑀚	𑀛	𑀜	𑀝	𑀞	𑀟	𑀠	𑀡	𑀢	𑀣	𑀤	𑀥	𑀦	𑀧	𑀨	𑀩	𑀪	𑀫	𑀬	𑀭	𑀮	𑀯	𑀰	𑀱	𑀲	𑀳
Kushana																																	
Gupta																																	
Devanagari	क	ख	ग	घ	ङ	च	छ	ज	झ	ञ	ट	ठ	ड	ढ	ण	त	थ	द	ध	न	प	फ	ब	भ	म	य	र	ल	व	श	ष	स	ह

== Inscriptions ==
The surviving inscriptions of the Gupta script are mostly found on iron or stone pillars, and on gold coins from the Gupta Dynasty. One of the most important was the Prayagraj (Allahabad) Prasasti. Composed by Harisena, the court poet and minister of Samudragupta, it describes Samudragupta's reign, beginning from his accession to the throne as the second king of the Gupta Dynasty and including his conquest of other kings. It is inscribed on the Allahabad pillar of Ashoka.

== Alphabet ==
The Gupta alphabet is composed of 37 letters: 32 consonants with the inherent ending "a" and 5 independent vowels. In addition diacritics are attached to the consonants in order to change the sound of the final vowel (from the inherent "a" to other sounds such as i, u, e, o, au ...). Consonants can also be combined into compounds, also called conjunct consonants (for example sa+ya are combined vertically to give "sya").

=== Independent vowels ===
Late Brahmi vowel diacritics

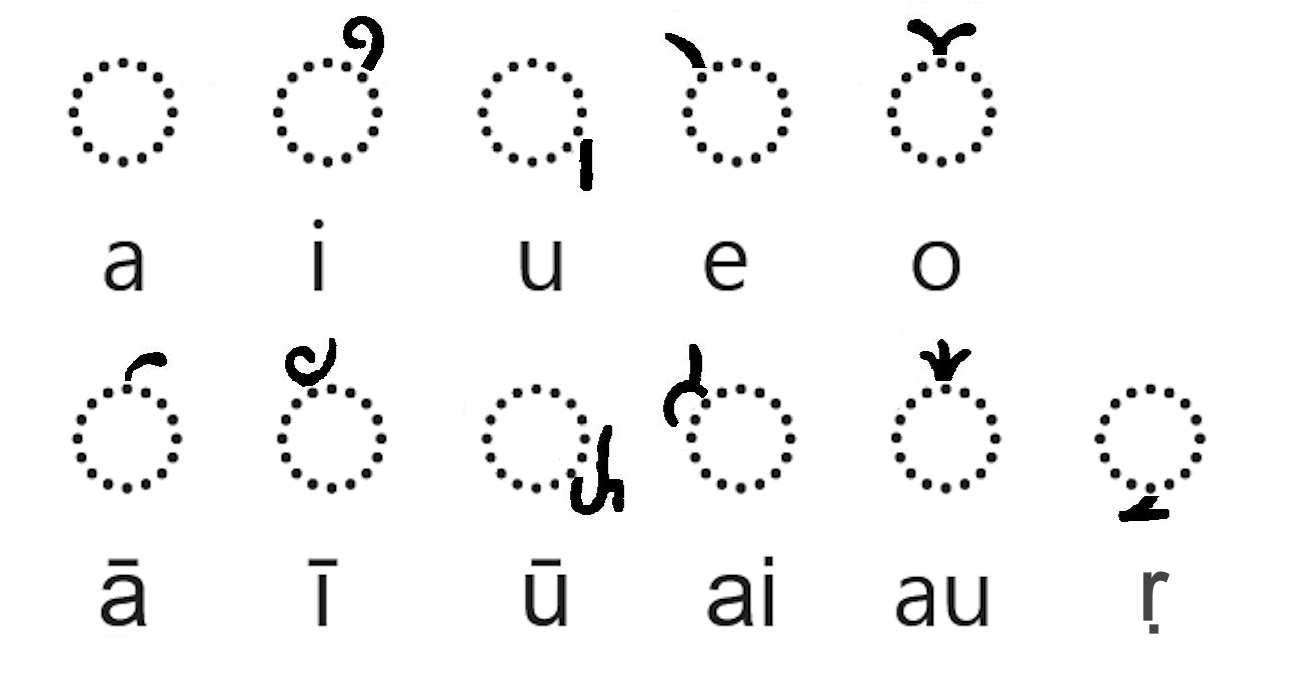
Gupta script vowel diacritics
(Allahabad standard).

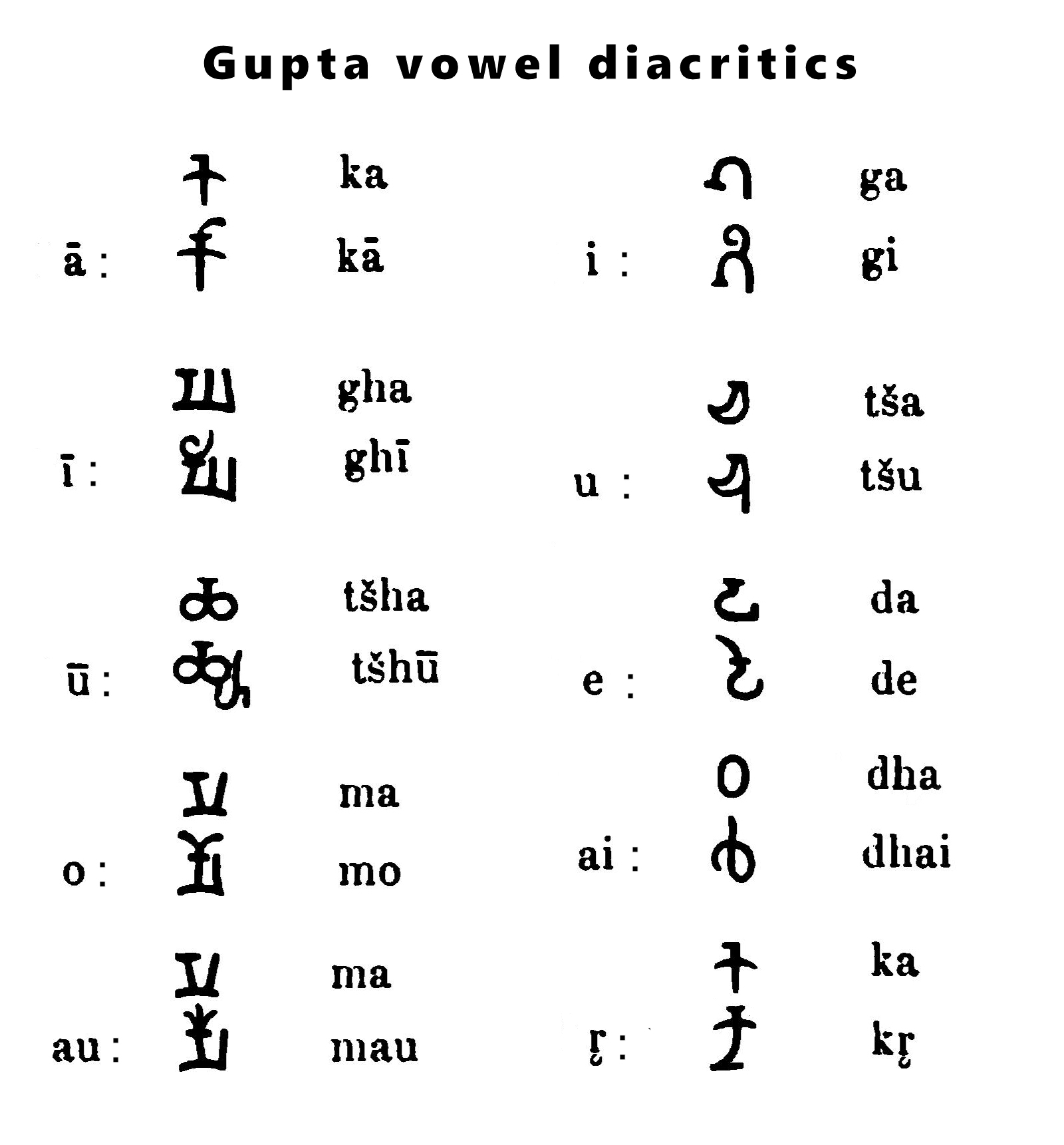
Usage examples

Letter	IAST and Sanskrit IPA	Letter	IAST and Sanskrit IPA
	a /ə/		ā /aː/
	i /i/		ī /iː/
	u /u/		ū /uː/
	e /eː/		o /oː/
	ai /əi/		au /əu/
𑀋	ṛ /r̩/	𑀌	ṝ /r̩ː/
𑀍	l̩ /l̩/	𑀎	ḹ /l̩ː/

=== Consonants ===
	Stop				Nasal	Approximant	Fricative	
Voicing →	Voiceless		Voiced				Voiceless	Voiced
Aspiration →	No	Yes	No	Yes	No		Yes	
Velar	ka /k/	kha /kʰ/	ga /g/	gha /ɡʱ/	ṅa /ŋ/			ha /ɦ/
Palatal	ca /c/	cha /cʰ/	ja /ɟ/	jha /ɟʱ/	ña /ɲ/	ya /j/	śa /ɕ/	
Retroflex	ṭa /ʈ/	ṭha /ʈʰ/	ḍa /ɖ/	ḍha /ɖʱ/	ṇa /ɳ/	ra /r/	ṣa /ʂ/	
Dental	ta /t̪/	tha /t̪ʰ/	da /d̪/	dha /d̪ʱ/	na /n/	la /l/	sa /s/	
Labial	pa /p/	pha /pʰ/	ba /b/	bha /bʱ/	ma /m/	va /w, ʋ/		

=== In Unicode ===
The Unicode Standard does not explicitly state that the Gupta script is considered a stylistic variation of Brahmi, though use of the Brahmi encoding is one approach.

Brahmi^{[1]}^{[2]} Official Unicode Consortium code chart (PDF)
	0	1	2	3	4	5	6	7	8	9	A	B	C	D	E	F
U+1100x	𑀀	𑀁	𑀂	𑀃	𑀄	𑀅	𑀆	𑀇	𑀈	𑀉	𑀊	𑀋	𑀌	𑀍	𑀎	𑀏
U+1101x	𑀐	𑀑	𑀒	𑀓	𑀔	𑀕	𑀖	𑀗	𑀘	𑀙	𑀚	𑀛	𑀜	𑀝	𑀞	𑀟
U+1102x	𑀠	𑀡	𑀢	𑀣	𑀤	𑀥	𑀦	𑀧	𑀨	𑀩	𑀪	𑀫	𑀬	𑀭	𑀮	𑀯
U+1103x	𑀰	𑀱	𑀲	𑀳	𑀴	𑀵	𑀶	𑀷	𑀸	𑀹	𑀺	𑀻	𑀼	𑀽	𑀾	𑀿
U+1104x	𑁀	𑁁	𑁂	𑁃	𑁄	𑁅	𑁆	𑁇	𑁈	𑁉	𑁊	𑁋	𑁌	𑁍		
U+1105x			𑁒	𑁓	𑁔	𑁕	𑁖	𑁗	𑁘	𑁙	𑁚	𑁛	𑁜	𑁝	𑁞	𑁟
U+1106x	𑁠	𑁡	𑁢	𑁣	𑁤	𑁥	𑁦	𑁧	𑁨	𑁩	𑁪	𑁫	𑁬	𑁭	𑁮	𑁯
U+1107x	𑁰	𑁱	𑁲	𑁳	𑁴	𑁵										BNJ
Notes 1.As of Unicode version 17.0 2.Grey areas indicate non-assigned code points

== Gupta numismatics ==
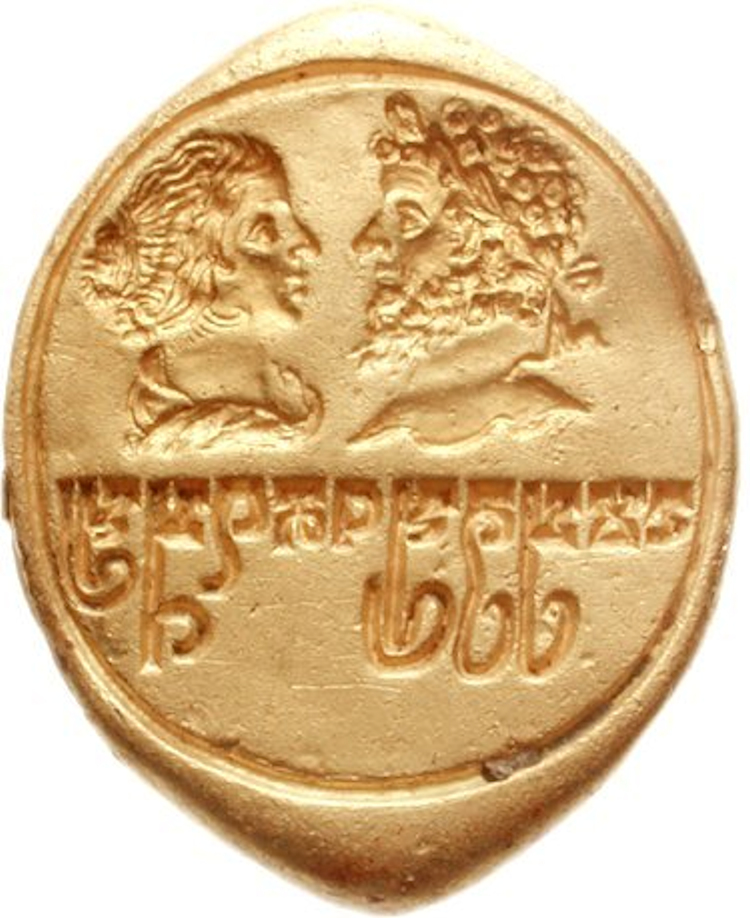
Kushan Empire signet in Gupta Brahmi script, showing Septimius Severus and Julia Domna. The seal reads Damputrasya Dhanguptasya ("[Seal of] Dhangupta son of Dama). 3rd century CE.

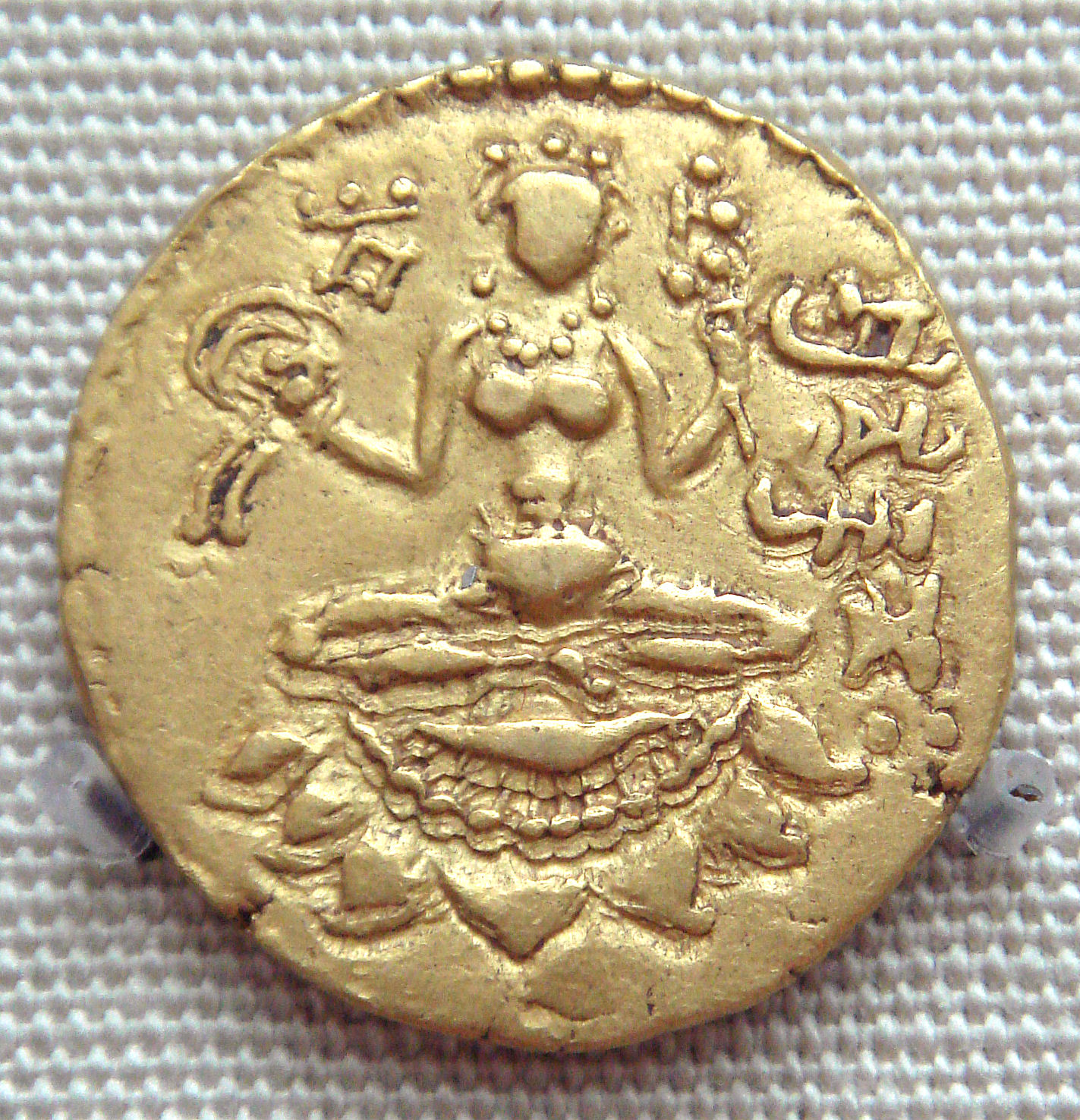
Coin of Vikramaditya (Chandragupta II) with the name of the king in Gupta Brahmi script 380–415 CE.

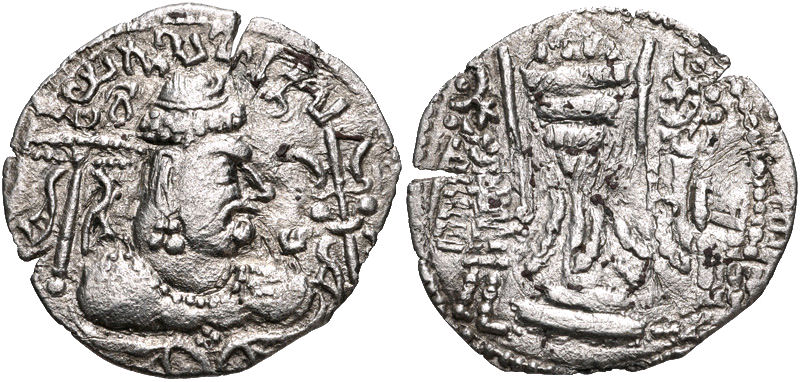
Coin of Alchon Huns ruler Mihirakula. Obv: Bust of king, with legend in Gupta script (Ja)yatu Mihirakula ("Let there be victory to Mihirakula"). Rev: Dotted border around Fire altar flanked by attendants.

The study of Gupta coins began with the discovery of a hoard of gold coins in 1783. Many other such hoards have since been discovered, the most important being the Bayana (situated in Bharatpur district of Rajasthan) hoard, discovered in 1946, which contained more than 2000 gold coins issued by the Gupta Kings. Many of the Gupta Empire's coins bear inscriptions of legends or mark historic events. In fact, it was one of the first Indian Empires to do so, probably as a result of its unprecedented prosperity. Almost every Gupta king issued coins, beginning with its first king, Chandragupta I.

The scripts on the coin are also of a different nature compared to scripts on pillars, due to conservatism regarding the coins that were to be accepted as currency, which would have prevented regional variations in the script from manifesting on the coinage. Moreover, space was more limited especially on their silver coins, and thus many of the symbols are truncated or stunted. An example is the symbol for /ta/ and /na/, which were often simplified to vertical strokes.

== Gallery ==
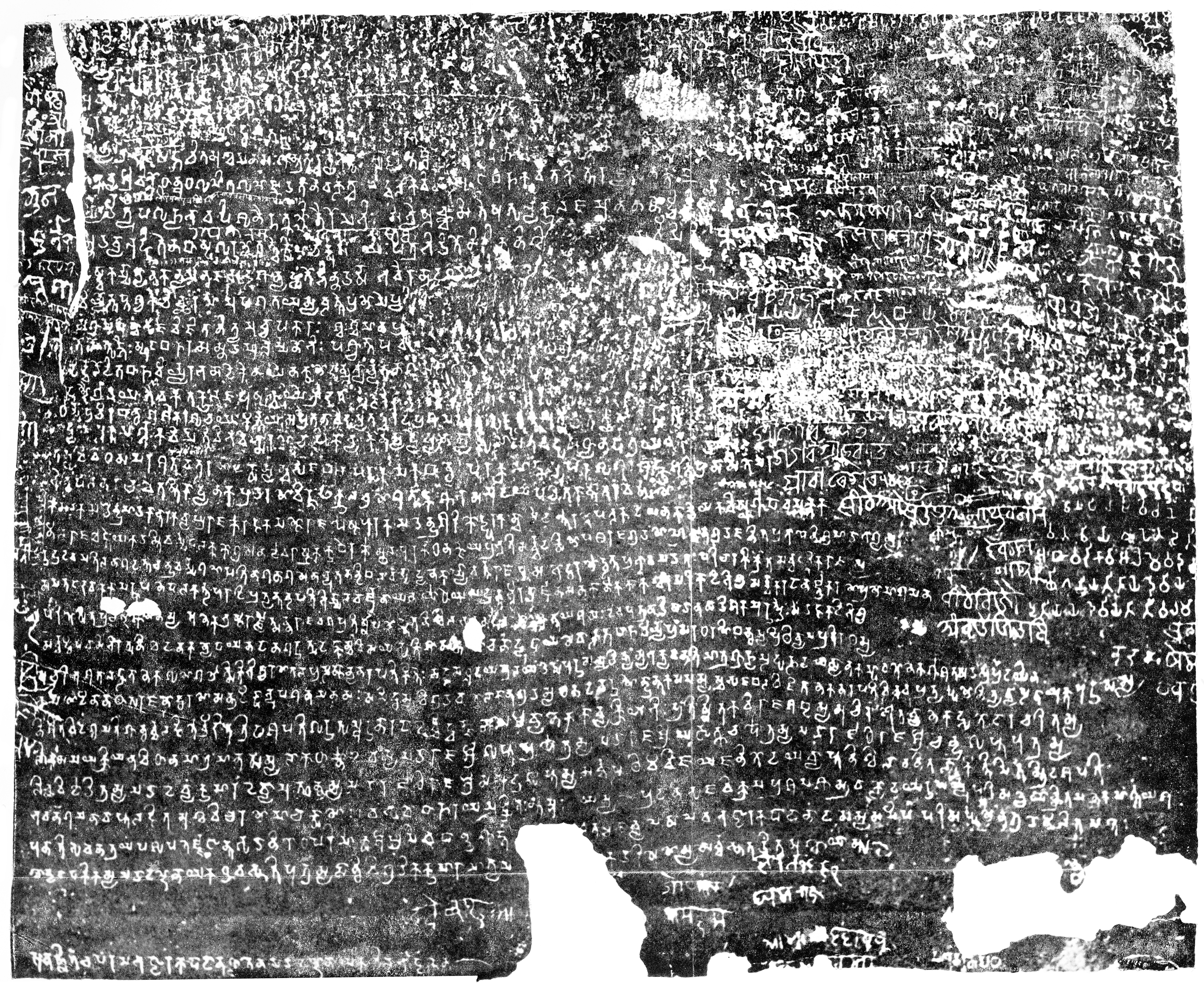
The Allahabad pillar inscription of Samudragupta, with its standardised Gupta characters.

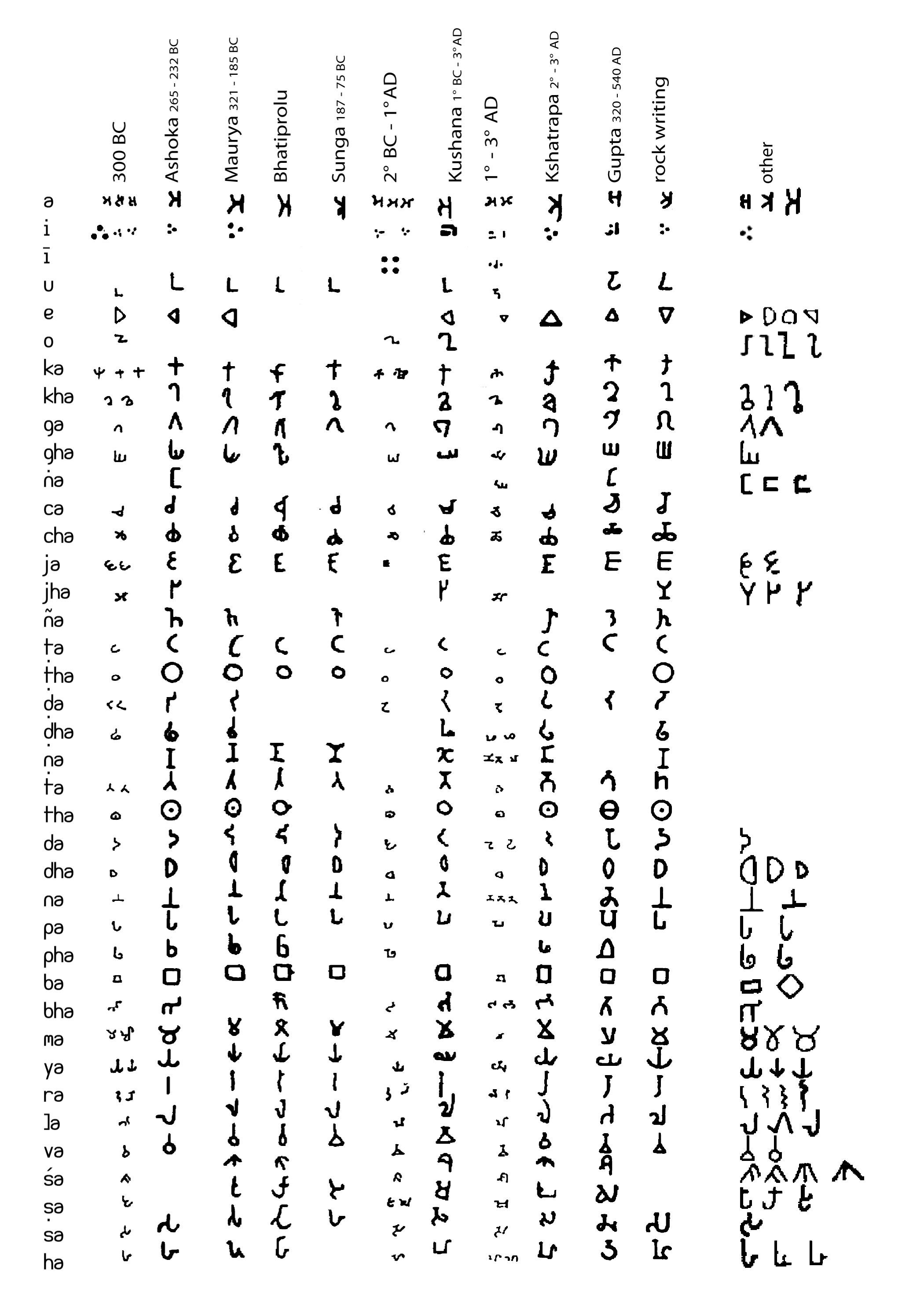
Brahmi and its descendant scripts.

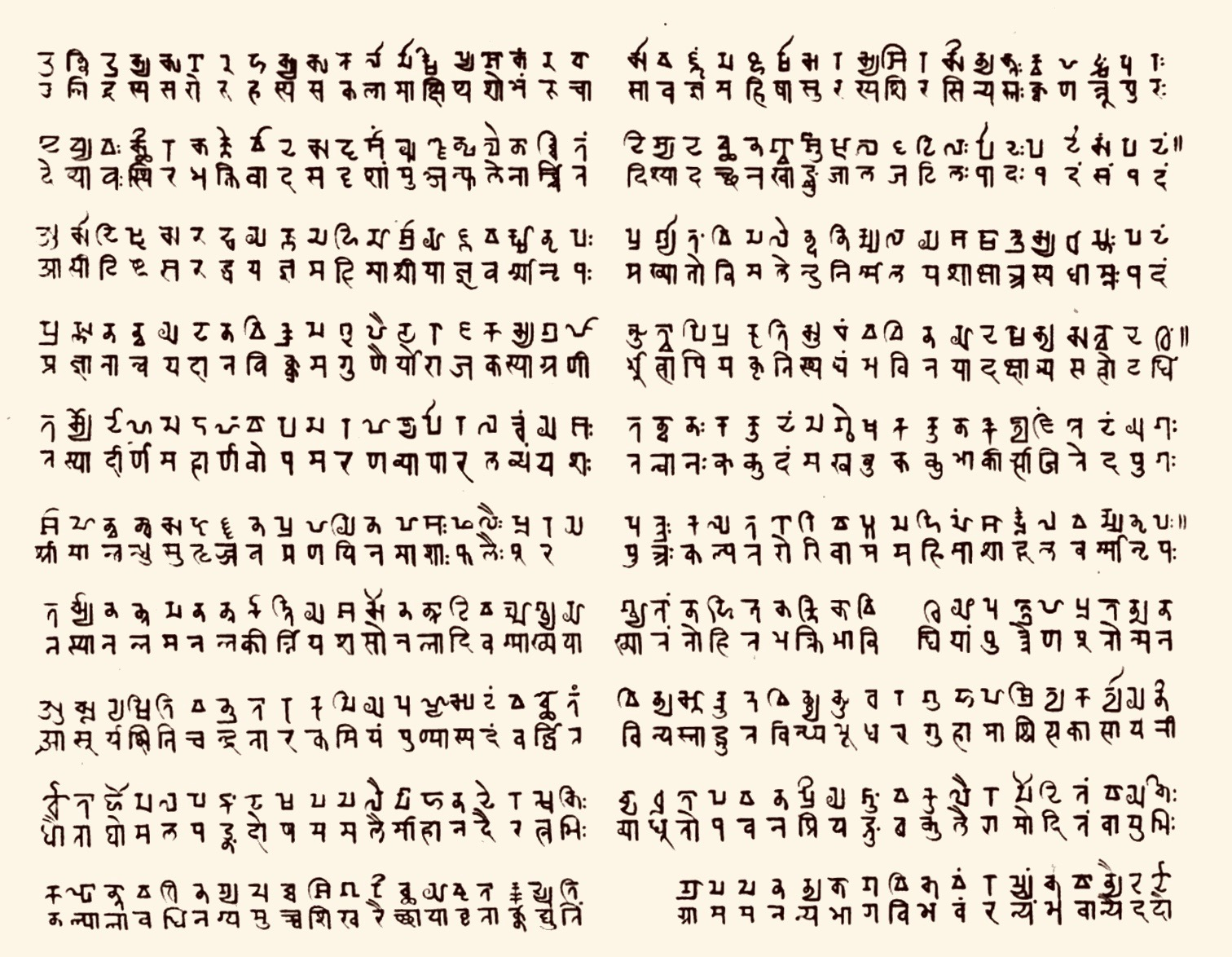
The 5th- or 6th-century Gupta script Gopika Cave Inscription in Sanskrit about goddess Durga

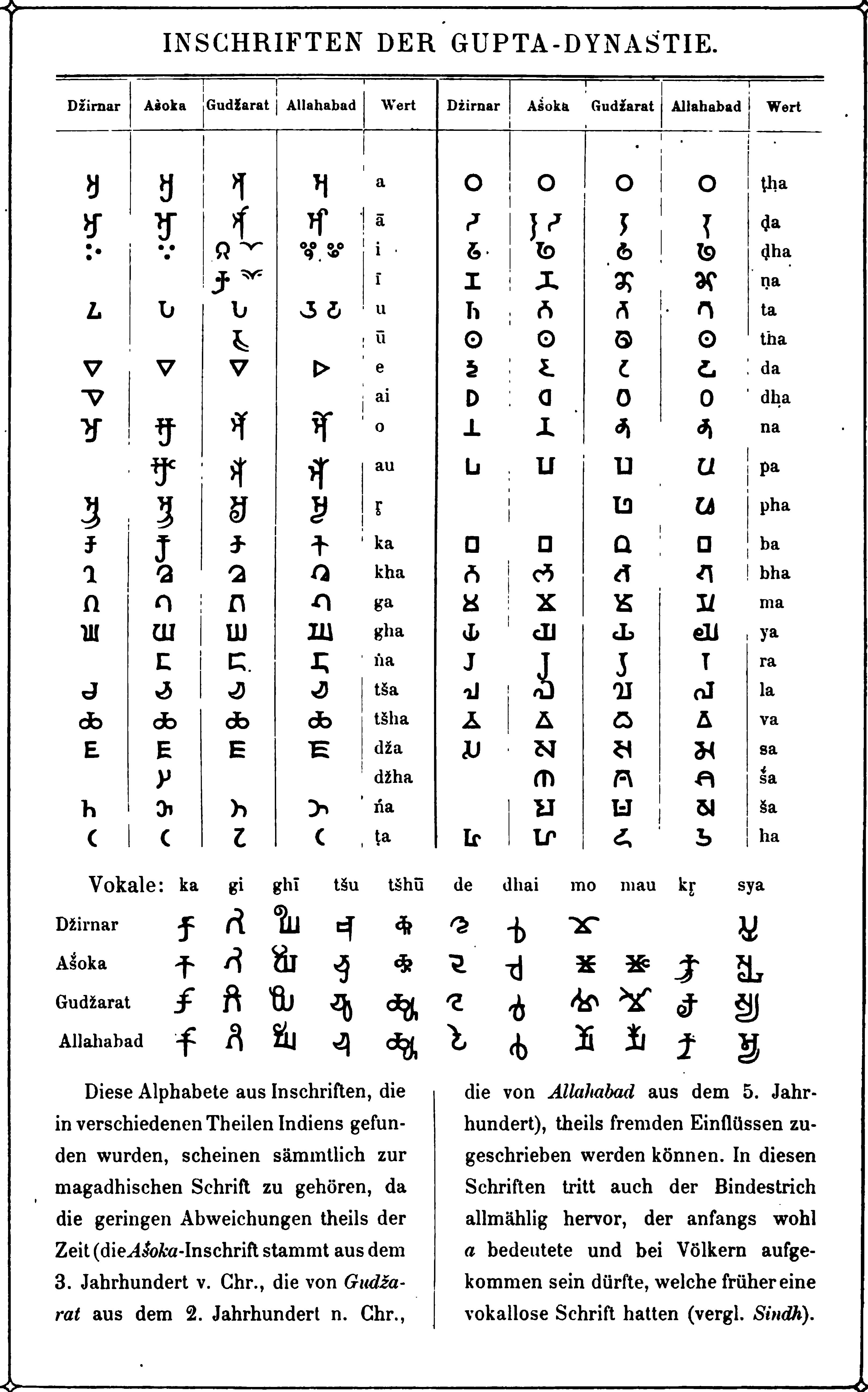
Gupta script decipherment table

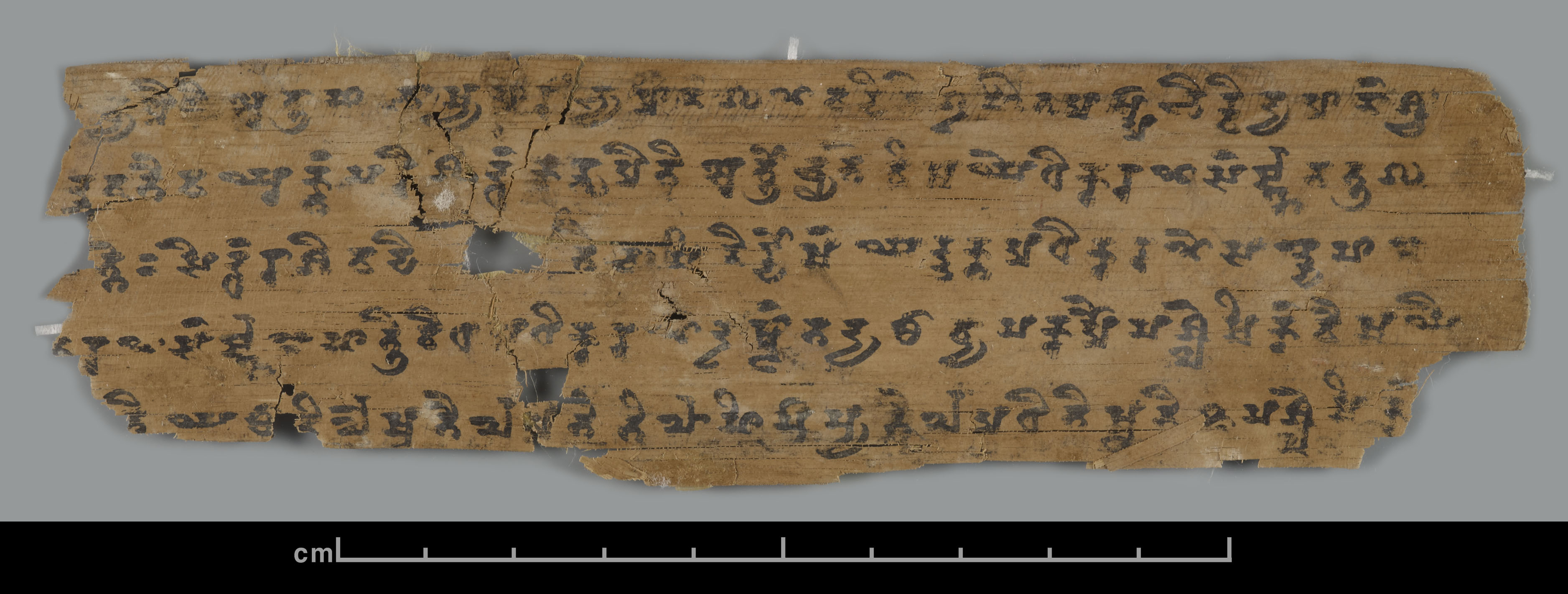
A palm leaf Sanskrit manuscript in early Gupta Brahmi script, discovered in Miran, northwest China.

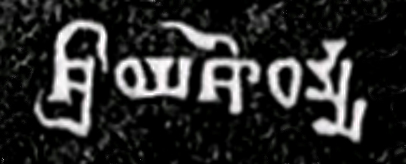
The name Śrī Yaśodharmma ("Lord Yashodharman") in Gupta script in Line 4 of the Mandsaur stone inscription of Yashodharman-Vishnuvardhana.

== See also ==
- Bengali–Assamese script
- Bhattiprolu script
- Brahmic scripts
- Kadamba script
- Lipi scripts
- Pallava script
- Telugu-Kannada alphabet
