= Nagda-Khachrod Assembly constituency =

Constituency of the Madhya Pradesh legislative assembly in India

Coordinates: 23.45°N 75.35°E

Nagda-Khachrod
- Constituency No. 212 for the Madhya Pradesh Legislative Assembly

Constituency details
- Country: India
- Region: Central India
- State: Madhya Pradesh
- District: Ujjain
- Lok Sabha constituency: Ujjain
- Established: 1957
- Reservation: None

Member of Legislative Assembly
- 16th Madhya Pradesh Legislative Assembly
- Incumbent Tej Bahadur Singh Chauhan
- Party: Bharatiya Janata Party
- Elected year: 2023
- Preceded by: Dilip Singh Gurjar

Nagda-Khachrod Assembly constituency is one of the 230 Vidhan Sabha (State Legislative Assembly) constituencies of Madhya Pradesh state in central India.

== Overview ==
Nagda-Khachrod (Assembly constituency number 212) is one of the 7 Vidhan Sabha constituencies located in Ujjain district. This large constituency covers two cities Nagda and Khachrod with over 120 villages.

== Members of the Legislative Assembly ==
Election	Member	Party
Khachrod
1957	Kunwar Veerendra Singh	Hindu Mahasabha
1962	Bhairav Bhartiya	Independent politician
1967	Kunwar Veerendra Singh	Bharatiya Jana Sangh
1972	Kunwar Veerendra Singh	Bharatiya Jana Sangh
1977	Purusottam Vipat	Janata Party
1980	Purusottam Vipat	Janata Party
1985	Ranchhodlal Aanjna	Indian National Congress
1990	Lal Singh Ranawat	Bharatiya Janata Party
1993	Dilip Singh Gurjar	Indian National Congress
1998	Lal Singh Ranawat	Bharatiya Janata Party
2003	Dilip Singh Gurjar	Independent politician
Nagda-Khachrod
2008	Dilip Singh Gurjar	Indian National Congress
2013	Dileep Singh Shekhawat	Bharatiya Janata Party
2018	Dilip Singh Gurjar	Indian National Congress
2023	Tej Bahadur Singh Chauhan	Bharatiya Janata Party

== Election results ==
=== 2023 ===
2023 Madhya Pradesh Legislative Assembly election: Nagda-Khachrod
Party	Candidate	Votes	%	±%
BJP	Tej Bahadur Singh Chauhan	93,552	52.18	+5.33
INC	Dilip Singh Gurjar	77,625	43.3	−6.59
ASP(KR)	Narendra Chouhan	1,977	1.1	
NOTA	None of the above	1,126	0.63	−0.15
Majority		15,927	8.88	+5.84
Turnout		179,291	81.15	−0.88
BJP gain from INC		Swing		

=== 2018 ===
2018 Madhya Pradesh Legislative Assembly election: Nagda-Khachrod
Party	Candidate	Votes	%	±%
INC	Dilip Singh Gurjar	83,823	49.89	
BJP	Dilipsingh Shekhawat	78,706	46.85	
NOTA	None of the above	1,318	0.78	
Majority		5,117	3.04	
Turnout		168,010	82.03	
INC gain from		Swing		

== See also ==
- Nagda
- Khachrod
- Ujjain (Lok Sabha constituency)
