= Pariyatra Mountains =

Range of mountains mentioned in the Mahabharata and the Puranas

Pariyatra Mountains is a range of mountains mentioned in the epic Mahabharata and the Puranas. Mahabharata 2.10.31 calls it "Paripatra" 3.85.69 ff. "Prayaga" (according to 3.85.75 also called "Jaghana", the according to 3.87.18 f. holy area between Ganges and Yamuna), Harivamsa Purana 2.74.13 ff. "Pariyatra". According to Harivamsa Purana 2.74.15 Sri Krishna changed the name of the Pariyatra mountain to the name "Sanapada".

== Location ==
The Puranic Encyclopedia locates it with reference to the Vana Parva 188, 115 of the Mahabharata at "the western side of Mahameru".
