= Laxminarayan Pandey =

Indian politician

Dr. Laxminarayan Pandey

Member 5th, 6th, 9th, 10th, 11th, 12th, 13th and 14th Lok Sabha
- In office 1989 - 2009
- Preceded by: Balkavi Bairagi (INC)
- Succeeded by: Meenakshi Natarajan (INC)
- Constituency: Mandsaur

Personal details
- Born: 25 March 1928 Jaora, Jaora State, British India
- Died: 19 May 2016 (aged 88) Indore, Madhya Pradesh, India
- Party: Bharatiya Janata Party
- Spouse: Chandrawali Pandey
- Children: 3 sons and 4 daughters

Laxminarayan Pandey (28 March 1928 – 19 May 2016) was a member of the 5th, 6th, 9th, 10th, 11th, 12th, 13th, and 14th Lok Sabha of India. He represented the Mandsaur constituency of Madhya Pradesh and was a member of the Bharatiya Janata Party (BJP) political party.

== Political career ==
Pandey has had many spells as an MP. The first was in 1971 and 1977 where he was elected on the Bharatiya Jana Sangh (BJS) and Janata Party (JP) ticket, respectively. Pandey was the first MP from Mandsaur for Bharatiya Jana Sangh and a very close aide of Atal Bihari Vajpayee and LK Advani.

== Death ==
He died aged 88 in Indore, Madhya Pradesh after battling old-age related illnesses in a private hospital.
