= Dilip Singh Gurjar =

Indian politician from Madhya Pradesh

Member of Madhya Pradesh Legislative Assembly
- In office 2018–2023
- Preceded by: Dileep Singh Shekhawat
- Succeeded by: Tejbahadur Singh Chauhan
- Constituency: Nagda-Khachrod
- In office 2008–2013
- Preceded by: New constituency
- Succeeded by: Dileep Singh Shekhawat
- Constituency: Nagda-Khachrod
- In office 2003–2008
- Preceded by: Lal Singh Ranawat
- Succeeded by: Delimitation
- Constituency: Khachrod
- In office 1993–1998
- Preceded by: Lal Singh Ranawat
- Succeeded by: Lal Singh Ranaware
- Constituency: Khachrod

Personal details
- Education: Vikram University
- Profession: Agriculture

Dilip Singh Gurjar is an Indian politician. He was elected to the Madhya Pradesh Legislative Assembly from Nagda-Khachrod constituency for four terms. He is a member of the Indian National Congress.

== Political career ==
Gurjar has contested multiple elections and held office at various times:

Contested and won the Presidential Election of Vikram Vishvavidyalaya.

Served at various posts in Indian Youth Congress, including the President’s Post of MP Youth Congress.

- 1993: Elected as MLA from Khachrod on an INC ticket.
- 2003: Contested as an independent candidate and won, defeating both the BJP candidate by approximately 15,000 votes and the Congress candidate by around 50,000 votes.
- 2008: Contested and won from the newly formed Nagda-Khachrod constituency on a Congress ticket.
- 2018: Re-elected as MLA from Nagda-Khachrod for the 4th time.
- 2023: Contested from Nagda-Khachrod but lost to Tej Bahadur Singh Chauhan (BJP).
- 2024: Contested the Lok Sabha elections from the Mandsaur constituency but was defeated by BJP’s Sudhir Gupta.
