= Mandsaur =

- City
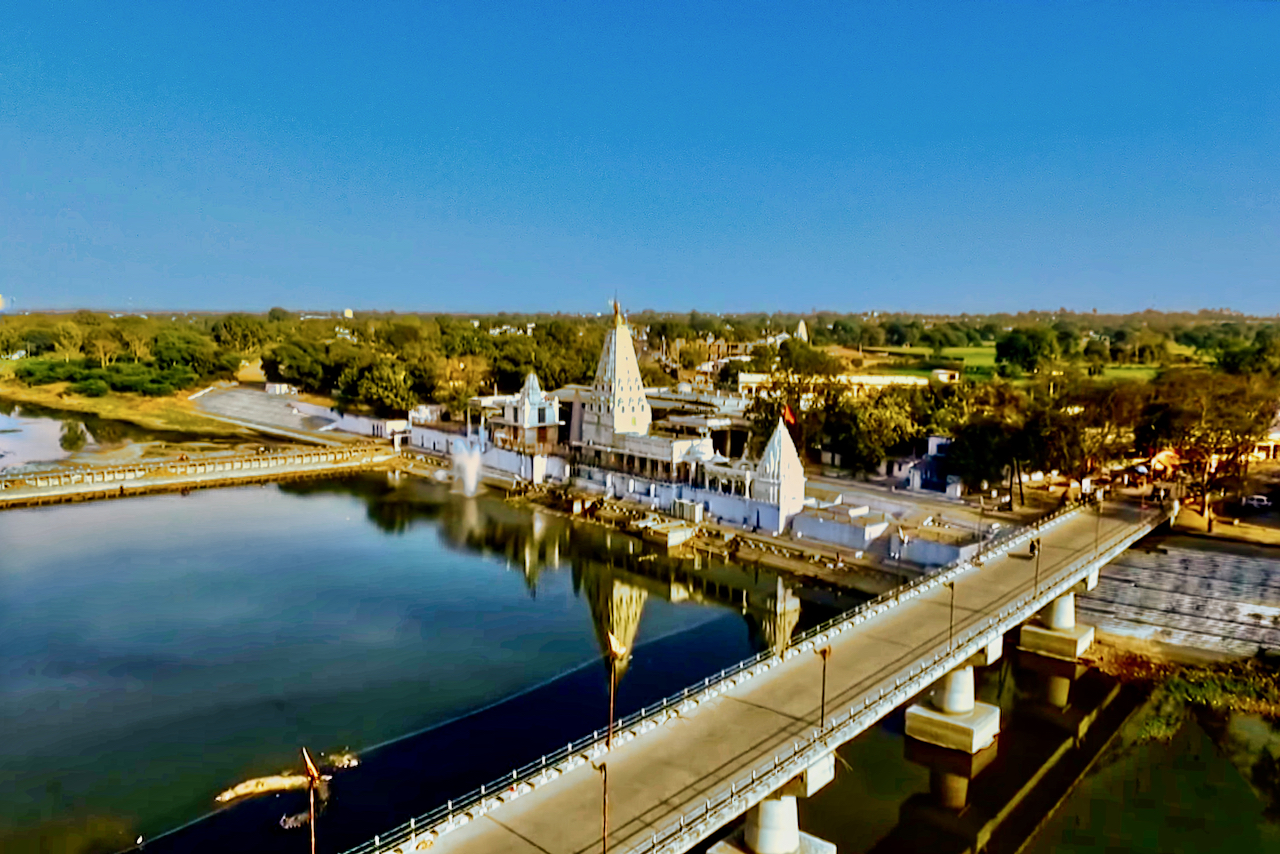
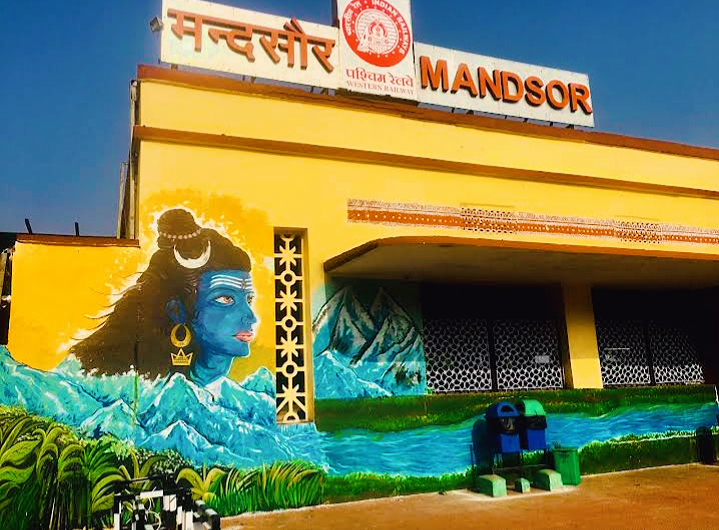
- Pashupati Nath Mahadev Mandir, Mandsaur, Mandsaur Railway Station building
- Nickname: Dashpur
- Location within Madhya Pradesh Location within India
- Coordinates: 24.072°N 75.069°E
- Country: India
- State: Madhya Pradesh
- District: Mandsaur district
- Named for: Dashpur

Government
  - Type: Mayor–Council
  - Body: Mandsaur Municipality
  - MLA: Vipin Jain INC
  - MP: Sudhir Gupta BJP
  - Mayor: Smt. Ramadevi Gujar BJP

Area
  - Total: 50 km^{2} (19 sq mi)

Population (2011)
  - Total: 141,667
  - Density: 2,800/km^{2} (7,300/sq mi)
- Demonym(s): Mandsauri, Mandsaurian

Demographics
  - Official language: Hindi
  - Literacy rate: 71.64%
- Time zone: UTC+5:30 (IST)
- PIN: 458001/2
- Telephone code: 07422
- Vehicle registration: MP-14
- Website: mandsaur.nic.in

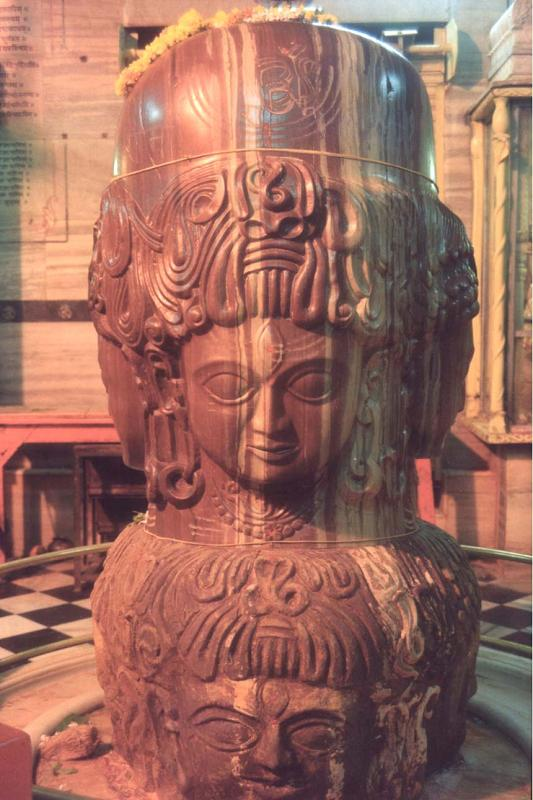
Idol of Lord Pashupatinath in Mandsaur

Mandsaur is a city and a municipality in Mandsaur district located on the border of Mewar and Malwa regions of Madhya Pradesh, a state in Central India. It is the administrative headquarters of Mandsaur District. The ancient Pashupatinath Temple is located in Mandsaur. Later come under Gwalior state Which was 2nd biggest state. Mandsaur is famous for its opium farming.

== Name ==
Mandsaur is identified with the city of Daśapura, which is attested in various ancient and medieval texts and inscriptions. According to the 12th-century Jain work called the Pariśiṣṭaparvan, the name Daśapura was given to the city by a group of merchants visiting the royal fortress of a king named Udayana and his ten sons.

== History ==
=== Aulikaras of Dashapura ===
Epigraphical discoveries have brought to light two ancient royal houses, who call themselves as Aulikaras and ruled from Dashapura (present-day Mandsaur). The first dynasty, who ruled from Dashapura from the beginning comprised the following kings in the order of succession: Jayavarma, Simhavarma, Naravarma, Vishvavarma and Bandhuvarma. The Risthal stone slab inscription discovered in 1983 has brought to light another Aulikara dynasty, which comprised the following kings in the order of succession: Drumavardhana, Jayavardhana Ajitavardhana, Vibhishanavardhana, Rajyavardhana and Prakashadharma. After Parakshadharma, the ruler of Mandsaur was Yashodharma, who is identified with Vishnuvardhana, who erected a pillar of victory at Bayana due to which Bayana's name became Vijaygarh. In all probabilities, he was the son and immediate successor of Prakashadharma.

=== Yashodharman rule ===
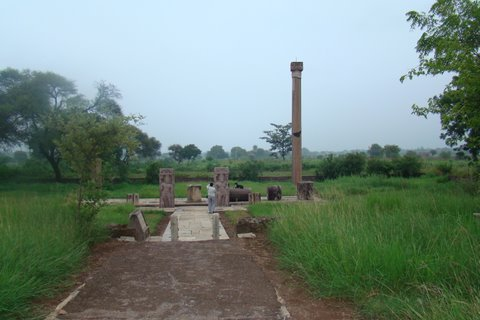
Victory pillar of Yashodharman at Sondani, Mandsaur

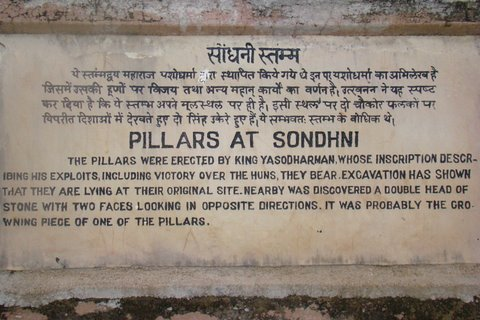
Info of Victory pillar of Yashodharman at Sondani, Mandsaur

Sondani (सोंधनी) is a small village at a distance of about 4 km from Mandsaur situated on Mahu-Nimach Highway towards Mahu. In a part of the inscription Yasodharman praises himself for having defeated king Mihirakula:

"He (Yasodharman) to whose two feet respect was paid, with complimentary presents of the flowers from the lock of hair on the top of (his) head, by even that (famous) king Mihirakula, whose forehead was pained through being bent low down by the strength of (his) arm in (the act of compelling) obeisance"

— Sondani pillar inscription

=== Gurjara-Pratihara Dynasty ===
The Gurjara Pratihara empire was extended up to Mandasor during the reign of Mahendrapala II.

=== Medieval era ===
There are two gardens in which there is a pillar of torandwar. It is believed to be pillar of Surya Mandir of the inscription of Bandhu Varma. There is a Shiva statue also in the garden.

=== Maratha Empire ===
The Battle of Mandsaur took place in Mandsaur, India between the Maratha Army and Jai Singh II of Amber. In February 1732, the Marathas completely surrounded Jai Singh with their enormous cavalry and started cutting of his supplies. The Jaipur Raja was forced to sue for peace, he offered the Marathas six lakhs, but Holkar refused and demanded more. While the negotiations were taking place, a rumour surfaced about reinforcements from the emperor. This raised the morale of the Jaipur army and the Rajputs got ready for battle, the Marathas quickly attacked the rearguard of the Jaipur army and killed its commander. The Rajputs also attacked and killed fifteen Maratha officers in the fight that followed. Holkar and his men retreated 30 miles away from the battlefield. Jai Singh followed them but was outpaced by the Maratha cavalry who reached Jai Singhs camp and forced him to surrender. Jai Singh was forced to give six lakhs to Holkar and allow him to collect chauth from 28 pargana's in Malwa. The Maratha victory at the Battle of Mandsaur had the following consequences: Scindias and Holkars were emboldened to renew their attack on Rajputana. Kota and Bundi were made the next targets in the same year by the Marathas.

=== Princely State ===
In 19th century before India's independence in 1947, Mandsaur was part of the princely state of Gwalior. It gave its name to the treaty with the Holkar Maharaja of Indore, who concluded the Third Anglo-Maratha War and the Pindari War in 1818. At the turn of the 20th century, it was a centre of the Malwa opium trade.

=== Mention in Kalidas Manuscript ===
The 47th stanza of Kalidas's poem Meghdoot (Purva-megha) mentions Dashpur. In his aesthetic piece of writing, Kalidas writes about the beauty of women's eyes in Dashpur.

== Geography ==
Mandsaur district is bordered by Neemuch and Ratlam districts of Madhya Pradesh and Chittorgarh, Kota, Jhalawar, Pratapgarh and Bhilwara districts of Rajasthan.

Mandsaur district forms the northern projection of Madhya Pradesh from its western Division, i.e., Ujjain Commissioner's Division. It lies between the parallels of latitude 230 45' 50" North and 250 2' 55" North, and between the meridians of longitude 740 42' 30" East and 750 50' 20" East.

The district is an average size district of Madhya Pradesh. It extends for about 142 km (88 mi) from north to south and 124 km (77 mi) from east to west. The total area is 5,521 km^{2} (2,132 sq mi) with a population of 1,16,483 in 2001.

== Demographics ==
As of 2011 India census, Mandsaur had a population of 141,468 male population was 72,370 and female population was 69,098, giving a sex-ration of 898. Mandsaur had an effective literacy rate of 86.79%, higher than the national average: male literacy was 92.74, and female literacy was 80.60%. 15,721 (11.1%) of the population was under 6 years of age.

== Education ==
The institutes and universities headquartered in Mandsaur include:

- Mandsaur Institute of Technology
- Mandsaur University
- Sunder Lal Patwa Government Medical College Mandsaur
- Mandsaur Institute of Ayurved Education and Research

== Notable people ==
- Yashodharman, the ruler of the Malava Empire
- Sudhir Gupta, Indian Politician
- Jagdish Devda, Indian Politician and deputy CM of MP
- Sunder Lal Patwa, Indian Politician and 11th CM of MP
- Virendra Kumar Sakhlecha, Indian Politician and 10th CM of MP
- Laxminarayan Pandey, Indian Politician
- Vipin Jain, Indian Politician

== Transportation ==
- Mandsaur Railway Station

It is the main station in Mandsaur. Its code is MDS. Mandsaur is B category railway station of Western Railway Zone on the Ajmer — Ratlam section. Mandsaur is connected to Ratlam, Ujjain via Nagda and Kota, Bundi via Chittorgarh.
