= Origin of the Gupta dynasty =

There are conflicting theories regarding the original homeland and ancestry of the Gupta dynasty that ruled northern India between 4th and 6th centuries. Modern historians variously theorize that it originated in present-day Uttar Pradesh or Bengal, based on epigraphic, numismatic and literary evidence. The social group (varna) of the dynasty is also a matter of debate, with scholars variously placing them in Vaishya, Brahmana, or other categories.

== Homeland ==
Nothing definitive is known about the Guptas' place of origin. They originated somewhere in the Gangetic plains, and eastern Uttar Pradesh, Magadha (Bihar) and Bengal have been variously proposed as their homeland. The capital of the early rulers of the dynasty is uncertain: various cities, including Prayaga, Pataliputra, Ayodhya, Kosambi, Ujjayini, Mathura, and Eran have been proposed as possible candidates.

=== Eastern Uttar Pradesh ===
According to one theory, the Guptas originated in present-day eastern Uttar Pradesh, and expanded their empire to Pataliputra and Bengal later.

Proponents of this theory, such as S. R. Goyal, B. P. Sinha and Sanjeev Kumar cite the provenance of the Gupta inscriptions and coins in their support.

For example:

- The recently found silver coin of Sri Gupta in Uttar Pradesh attest the origin of Guptas around Kāśī–Kannauj region and his rule was only limited to Kāśī (present day Varanasi).
- Of the 15 inscriptions issued during the first 150 years of the Gupta rule, 8 have been found in eastern Uttar Pradesh. On the other hand, only 2 of these inscriptions have been found in Bihar (historical Magadha), and only 5 have been found in Bengal. Samudragupta's Allahabad Pillar inscription, the dynasty's earliest extant inscription, has been found at Prayaga (modern Allahabad).
- Fourteen hoards of Gupta gold coins have been found in eastern Uttar Pradesh: these hoards generally include the coins of the early Gupta kings. On the other hand, only two hoards each have been found in Bihar and Bengal: these hoards mostly include the coins issued by the later Gupta kings.
- The Kaushambi style is prominent in the Gupta script.
- The popularity of the Ganga-Yamuna motif in the Gupta art suggests that the Prayaga (where these two rivers meet) was the centre of the original Gupta kingdom.

Criticism of this theory includes the following:

- Historian R. C. Majumdar dismisses the epigraphic evidence cited in support of this theory, pointing out that the earlier Maurya kings ruled in present-day Bihar, but most of their inscriptions have been found outside this area. Historian D. K. Ganguly similarly points out that the Varendra region in present-day Bengal was the homeland of the Pala kings, but most of the early Pala inscriptions have been discovered in present-day Bihar.
- The prevalence of the so-called Kaushambi style is not conclusive evidence either: this style was also used by the king Chandravarman, who ruled in present-day Bengal, and whose territory did not include eastern Uttar Pradesh. Moreover, so-called Malwa, Mathura and other 'eastern' styles were also prevalent alongside the Kaushambi style in the Gupta period.
- There is no evidence that the Ganga-Yamuna motif originated in Prayaga, and there is no evidence that the basin of these two rivers formed the heartland of the Gupta empire.
- Archaeological evidence proves that Bhita, which is located less than 20 km from Prayaga, appears to have been under the control of the Magha dynasty. Therefore, it is likely that the Guptas conquered Prayaga at a later time.

==== Puranic evidence ====
Another argument cited in favour of this theory is the Puranic descriptions of the Gupta territory:

- The Vishnu Purana states that the Guptas and the Magadhas (that is, the people of Magadha) will enjoy "the territory along the Ganges (up to) Prayaga". Some manuscripts of the Vishnu Purana add Magadha to this list of territories. Alternative translations read that the Guptas and Magadhas will enjoy "Prayaga on the Ganges and Magadha" or "territory along the Ganges, Prayaga, and Magadha". The text clearly mentions the Guptas and the Magadhas as two different groups of people, and does not imply that the Guptas were one of the Magadhas.
- The corresponding Vayu Purana verse states that the Gupta kings will enjoy "Prayaga on the Ganges, Saketa, and Magadha". Alternatively, the verse has been translated to state that the Guptas will enjoy "along the Ganges, Prayaga, Saketa, and Magadha".
- The Bhagavata Purana also states that "the Guptas will enjoy the earth up to Prayaga on the Ganges".
- The Puranic passages refer to the territory of the early Gupta kings: they cannot be a reference to the Gupta territories during the empire's period of decline, as they do not mention Bengal, which formed a part of the Gupta kingdom during this period.

Critics argue that:

- The Puranic passages do not refer to the reign of a specific king, and may not refer to the territory of the dynasty's earliest kings. For example, historian S. R. Goyal identifies the Magadhas with the Licchavis (the clan of the queen of Chandragupta I), and thus, theorizes that the Vishnu Purana alludes to an early phase of Gupta expansion. Chandragupta I was the third ruler of the dynasty, and the territory ruled by him was not same as the one ruled by his ancestors.
- The Puranic evidence is problematic, because the various Puranas differ in their lists of the Gupta territories: for example, the Vishnu Purana omits Saketa from the list. Historian Dasharatha Sharma argues that the Gupta power was concentrated in a narrow corridor running along the Ganges: this corridor includes Saketa, therefore, the Vishnu Purana description implies that Saketa was a part of the Gupta kingdom. However, historian Dilip Kumar Ganguly notes that the Puranic descriptions are quite vague, and scholars have variously interpreted these verses to mean the Guptas ruled "Prayaga on the Ganges", or Prayaga and "the territory along the Ganges".
- The corresponding passage in the various manuscripts of Bhagavata Purana either does not mention the word "Gupta", or uses it as a common noun meaning "protected" instead of using it as the name of a specific dynasty. Even some manuscripts of the Vayu Purana use the words "Guhya", "sapta" or "Manidhanyaka" instead of "Gupta". Supporters of the theory dismiss these as scribal mistakes.

=== Magadha ===
One theory traces the dynasty's origin in the Magadha region of present-day Bihar, with some proponents theroizing that their ancestral territory also included a part of present-day Bengal. Proponents of the Magadha origin note that Magadha is location of the dynasty's reputed capital, Pataliputra. Critics point out that it is not certain if Pataliputra was indeed the dynasty's capital.

=== Bengal ===
According to another theory, the original capital of the territory was located in the present-day Bengal region. According to the proponents of this theory, the dynasty's founder Gupta probably ruled a small territory in the Bengal region, and his descendants captured a larger territory in the Ganges basin, which is described in the Puranas. Alternatively, they propose that Gupta's kingdom extended from Prayaga in the west to northern Bengal in the east.

Much of the debate on this view hinges around the identity of Mi-li-kia-si-kia-po-no, a place mentioned by the 7th century Chinese Buddhist monk Yijing. According to Yijing, king Che-li-ki-to (identified with the dynasty's founder Shri Gupta) built a temple for Chinese pilgrims near Mi-li-kia-si-kia-po-no. This temple was located more than 40 yojanas east of Nalanda, along the Ganges river.

Historian D. C. Ganguly located Mi-li-kia-si-kia-po-no in Murshidabad district of West Bengal state of India, by taking 1 yojana as 5.71 miles, and concluded that the Guptas originated in this area. Ganguly notes that according to Yijing, at the time of his visit, the temple site was under the rule of king Deva-varma of eastern India. This king can possibly be identified with the Khadga king Deva-khadga who ruled in Bengal during Yijing's time. Moreover, Yijing places Magadha in 'mid-India', not eastern India. Ganguly theorizes that Shri-gupta's rule was limited to Bengal, while Pataliputra and Magadha were under the Lichchhavi rule.

According to R. C. Majumdar, Mi-li-kia-si-kia-po-no was located either in the Malda district of West Bengal or Rajshahi District of Bangladesh. However, unlike Ganguly, Majumdar does not consider this as evidence of Bengal being the Gupta homeland. According to Majumdar, this only proves that the Bengal region was a part of the territory ruled by the dynasty's founder; it may be possible that the Guptas originally ruled in Magadha, and extended their rule to Bengal, or vice versa.

To support his identification of Mi-li-kia-si-kia-po-no as a place in Bengal, Majumdar interpreted the word as a transcription of Mriga-sthapana rather than Mriga-shikha-vana. According to a 1015 CE manuscript, Mṛgasthāpana was the name of a stupa located in the historical Varendra region, which is now a part of Bengal. Other scholars have disputed this interpretation, as "Mi-li-kia-si-kia-po-no" is closer to the word "Mriga-shikha-vana".

Criticism of this theory includes the following:

- There is no epigraphic or numismatic evidence connecting the early Guptas to the Bengal region. Critics such as B. P. Sinha identify Mriga-shikha-vana with the deer park of Sarnath in present-day Uttar Pradesh, theorizing that the site's location as east of Nalanda is based on faulty interpretations of the original text.
- Tej Ram Sharma argues that Mi-li-kia-si-kia-po-no sounds much more homophonically and linguistically similar to Mrigasikhāvana (deer park of Sarnath).
- D.C. Sircar disagrees with the notion that Bengal was the homeland of Guptas. He further states that the inclusion of Varendra in Gupta dominion doesn't necessarily mean that it was the ancestral home of Guptas.

=== Other theories ===
Historian B. P. Sinha theorized that the Guptas originated in the Mathura-Ayodhya region in present-day Uttar Pradesh. He interpreted a phrase in the Arya-manjushri-mula-kalpa to argue that the Guptas belonged to Mathura. In support of this theory, Sinha stated that Samudragupta's coins were influenced by the coinage of the Kushan Empire, of which Mathura was an important centre. However, Sinha's interpretation of the Arya-manjushri-mula-kalpa passage is doubtful, and the phrase has been alternatively read as "Mathurayam-Jato-vamshadyah", referring to the birth ("jāto") of a person at Mathura. Moreover, Samudragupta's coins show the influence of the later Kushan coins of Punjab, not the coins of Mathura. Finally, it is generally accepted by modern scholars that Mathura first came under the Gupta rule, when Samudragupta defeated the Naga king Ganapati-naga, and annexed his territory to the Gupta empire.

== Ancestry ==
The Pune and Riddhapur inscriptions of the Gupta princess Prabhavati-gupta, the daughter of Chandragupta II, state that she belonged to the Dharana gotra (clan). Her husband Rudrasena II belonged to the Vishnu-vriddha gotra, as attested by the Chamak copper plates of his son Pravarasena II. Therefore, it is likely that Dharana was the name of her paternal gotra, that is, the gotra of the Gupta family.

The Dharana gotra has been interpreted in various ways:

- K. P. Jayaswal connected it to the Jat clans named Dhanri and Dharaniya. To support his theory of Jat origin of the Guptas, Jayaswal identified king Chandrasena mentioned in the play Kaumudi-Mahotsava with Chandragupta I: this play mentions Chandrasena as Karaskara, which Jayaswal connected to "Kakkar", the name of a Jat gotra. However, the clans called Dharana are also found among other communities, and Jayaswal's identification of Chandrasena as Chandragupta I is wrong: it has now been conclusively proved that the play Kaumudi-Mahotsava has nothing to do with the early Gupta history. Historian B. P. Sinha interpreted a phrase in the Arya-manjushri-mula-kalpa to argue that the Guptas belonged to the Jat community of Mathura. However, Sinha's reading is doubtful, and the phrase has been alternatively read as "Mathurayam-Jato-vamshadyah", referring to the birth ("jāto") of a person at Mathura.
- Historian H. C. Raychaudhuri theorized that the Guptas may have been related to Dharini, the queen of the Shunga ruler Agnimitra. However, this theory has been rejected by other scholars. Mere similarity of the words "Dharana" and "Dharini" is not sufficient evidence to connect these two dynasties.
- Based on evidence from the Skanda Purana, historian Dasharatha Sharma theorizes that Dharana was a gotra of the Brahmanas of the historical Dharmaranya region in the present-day Mirzapur district. According to him, the Guptas were not Brahmanas, but "adopted" the gotra of their Brahmana gurus.

An alternative reading of Prabhavati-gupta's inscriptions suggests that Dharana was not her gotra, but the gotra of her mother Kuberanaga.

=== Vaishyas ===
Some historians, such as A. S. Altekar, have theorized that the Guptas were originally Vaishyas, as some ancient Indian texts (such as the Vishnu Purana) prescribe the name "Gupta" for the members of the Vaishya varna.

Critics of this theory argue that:

- The suffix Gupta features in the names of several non-Vaishyas before as well as during the Gupta period, and cannot be considered as concrete evidence of the Gupta kings being Vaishyas.
- The early records of the Gupta dynasty do not describe "Gupta" as their family's name: it is possible that the family came to be known as Gupta simply because the names of their kings bore the suffix "-gupta", or after the dynasty's founder Gupta.

=== Brahmanas ===
Some scholars, such as S. R. Goyal, theorize that the Guptas were Brahmanas because they had matrimonial relations with Brahmanas:

- Prabhavati-gupta, a daughter of Chandragupta II, married the Vakataka king Rudrasena II, who was a Brahmana.
- The Kadamba king Kakustha-varman (a Brahmana according to these scholars) married one of his daughters to a Gupta king.
- According to the Buddhist scholar Paramartha, the Gupta king Baladitya married his sister to Vasurata, who was a Brahman.
- According to the Mandsaur stone inscription of Yashodharman, the Brahmana Ravikirtti had a wife named "Bhanugupta". This "Bhanugupta" may actually have been a daughter of the Gupta king Bhanugupta.

Supporters of this theory also point out that there are several instances of Brahmana names ending in "-gupta", such as Vishnugupta and Brahmagupta.

Critics of this theory argue that:

- If the Guptas were indeed Brahmanas, they would have proudly mentioned this in their inscriptions, as the Brahmanas hold the highest status among the four varnas. But none of the Gupta records mention the dynasty's varna. Samudragupta proudly mentioned his maternal ancestry from the Licchavis, who were not Brahmanas, and are regarded as "impure" in the Brahmanical text Manusamhita.
- The marriage of the Kadamba princess to a Gupta king may have been a result of political considerations. The other three instances involve Gupta princesses marrying Brahmana men: the marriage of a lower-varna woman to a higher-varna man was acceptable (anuloma) in the contemporary society, and therefore, these marriages cannot be considered as evidence of the Guptas themselves being Brahmanas.
- There are several instances of ancient Indian kings marrying outside their social group, including foreigners.
