= Kacha (king) =

- Maharajadhiraja; Sarva-rajocchetta
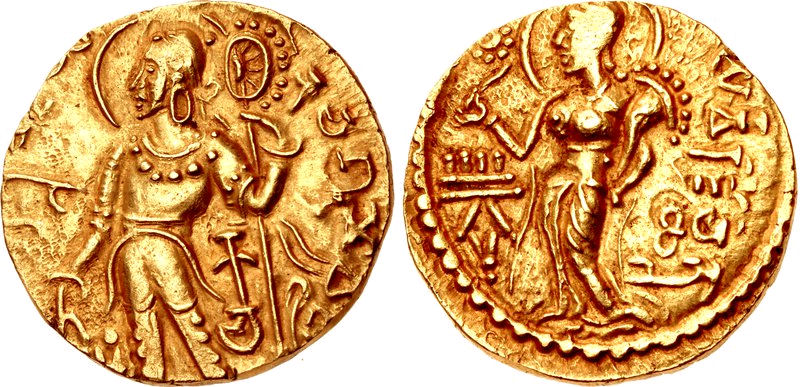
- Gold coin of Kacha. Chakradhvaja type. Obverse: Kacha, nimbate, standing left, sacrificing at altar and holding filleted chakradhvaja (wheel-standard); legend Kā-cha in Gupta script vertically below left arm, circular Brahmi legend around Kacho gamavajitya divam karmabhir-uttamair-jayati ("Having conquered the earth, Kacha wins the heaven by excellent deeds").. Reverse: Goddess (possibly Lakshmi) standing left, holding flower and cornucopia, Brāhmī legend at right: Sarvarājochchhettā ("Exterminator of all kings").

Possible Gupta emperor
- Reign: 4th century CE
- Predecessor: Possibly Chandragupta I
- Successor: Possibly Samudragupta
- House: Gupta
- Father: Chandragupta I
- Religion: Vaishnavism

Kacha (Gupta script: Kā-cha, IAST: Kāca, c. 4th century) was a king of India, possibly a member of the Gupta dynasty. He is known only from his gold coins, which are similar to those of the Gupta king Samudragupta.

Kacha's identity is a matter of debate among modern historians: two popular theories are that he was either Samudragupta himself, or that he was a brother of Samudragupta. According to the first theory, Kacha may have assumed the regnal name "Samudra-gupta" after extending his empire's borders up to the ocean ("samudra"). According to the second theory, Kacha probably contested Samudragupta's claim to the throne, and ruled for a brief period. Alternative theories identify him with other Gupta rulers such as Ramagupta, or as a non-Gupta usurper.

== Coinage ==
Find spots of Kacha's coins

Kacha is known from some gold coins dated to the early Gupta period: these coins bear the legend "Kacha" under the king's image. However, he is not mentioned in the Gupta genealogies or any other source.

The obverse of these coins depicts the king dressed in a way similar to the standard type coins of Samudragupta. The king is seen holding a chakra-dhvaja (wheel-standard) in his left hand, and offering incense on an altar with his right hand. One variety of Kacha's coins also depict a Garuda-dhvaja (Garuda flag) in front of him. The circular legend (in Upagati metre) on this side reads Kacho gamavajitya divam karmabhir-uttamair-jayati ("Having conquered the earth, Kacha wins the heaven by excellent deeds").

The reverse side depicts a goddess (possibly Lakshmi) with a halo. She is seen wearing a sari, a bodice, an upper garment, ear-rings, a necklace and armlets. She stands on a carpet, and holds a cornucopia in her left hand. In most coins of this style, she holds a flower in her right hand; in a few coins, she holds a noose in her right hand. The legend on this side reads Sarva-rajochchhetta ("exterminator of all kings").

Kacha's coins have been unearthed at Tanda, Kasarva (or Kaserwa) in Ballia district, Kumarkhan in Ahmedabad district, Sakour (or Sakori) in Damoh district, Bayana, and Jaunpur.

== Identification ==
Comparison of Kacha's coins with those issued by other Gupta kings suggests that he ruled sometime in the 4th century CE or first quarter of the 5th century. For example, Kacha's coins weigh between 111 and 118 grains. The coins of the early Gupta kings are closer in weight to Kacha's coins: for example, over 80% of the coins issued by Samudragupta and Chandragupta II, who ruled in the 4th century, weigh 121 grains. On the other hand, the coins issued by the 5th century Gupta kings weigh more: 75% of Kumaragupta I's coins weight 127 grains, while Skandagupta's coins weigh as much as 144 grains. Moreover, most of Kacha's coins have been found in hoards containing the coins of Chandragupta I, Samudragupta, and Chandragupta II.

There are two popular theories about Kacha's identity:

1. Kacha was another name for Samudragupta
2. Kacha was an elder brother of Samudragupta, and a rival claimant to the Gupta throne

Several other theories have also been put forward, including that Kacha may have been a foreign invader.

=== Samudragupta ===
According to one theory, Kacha was another name of Samudragupta: it is possible that he was earlier known as Kacha, and acquired the regnal name "Samudra" (literally "ocean") after extending his territory up to the ocean.

Arguments cited in favour of this theory include:

- The legend on the obverse of Kacha's coins boasts that he conquered the earth, and then won the heaven by his excellent deeds. This suggests that he became a sovereign ruler, and then performed religious and charitable deeds. A similar legend also occurs on the coins of Samudragupta: it does not occur on the coin legends of any other earlier king.
- The above-mentioned legend indicates that Kacha had a long reign: thus, he could not have been someone who seized the throne for a short period, such as during a brief interval between Chandragupta I's death and Samudragupta's ascension.
- The reverse of Kacha's coins is similar to that of Samudragupta's tiger-slayer and ashvamedha type coins.
- The legend on the reverse of Kacha's coins describes him as the "exterminator of all kings", an epithet applied to Samudragupta in the Gupta records. This legend does not appear on the coins of any other Gupta ruler.
- The above-mentioned legend fits in with the description of Samudragupta's extensive conquests in the Allahabad Pillar inscription. Kacha could not have preceded Samudragupta, because if Kacha had "exterminated" all these kings, there was no need for Samudragupta to subdue them. Similarly, if Kacha had succeeded Samudragupta, there was no need for Kacha to subjugate these kings, because Samudragupta had already defeated them.

Critics of this theory argue that:

- Kacha's coins vary from Samudragupta's coins in several ways. For example:
  - Over 80% of Samudragupta's coins weigh 121 grains, while Kacha's coins weigh between 111 and 118 grains.
  - The female figure depicted on Kacha's coins is shown wearing an upper garment besides a bodice, while the female figures displayed on Samudragupta's tiger-slayer and ashvamedha type coins are shown wearing only a bodice. The objects in the hands of these female figures are also different.
  - Kacha's coins feature a symbol either at the top-left or the centre-left: this symbol is not found on Samudragupta's tiger-slayer and ashvamedha type coins.
- The Gupta kings, without exception, used only one name on their coins. Samudragupta is known to have issued coins under the name "Samudragupta", therefore, the coins with the legend Kacha are not likely to have been issued by him.
- Mere similarity of coin legends cannot be used to identify two kings as identical: similar legends appear on coins of kings known to be different persons.
- Samudragupta's own coins do not describe him as the "exterminator of all kings". The Nalanda and Gaya inscriptions attributed to him mention this epithet, but the authenticity of these inscriptions is doubtful.
- Grandiloquent titles are quite common in Indian history, and grand claims such as that of having conquered the earth should not be taken at face value. These titles and claims cannot be used to make conclusions about Kacha's actual military achievements or the length of his reign.
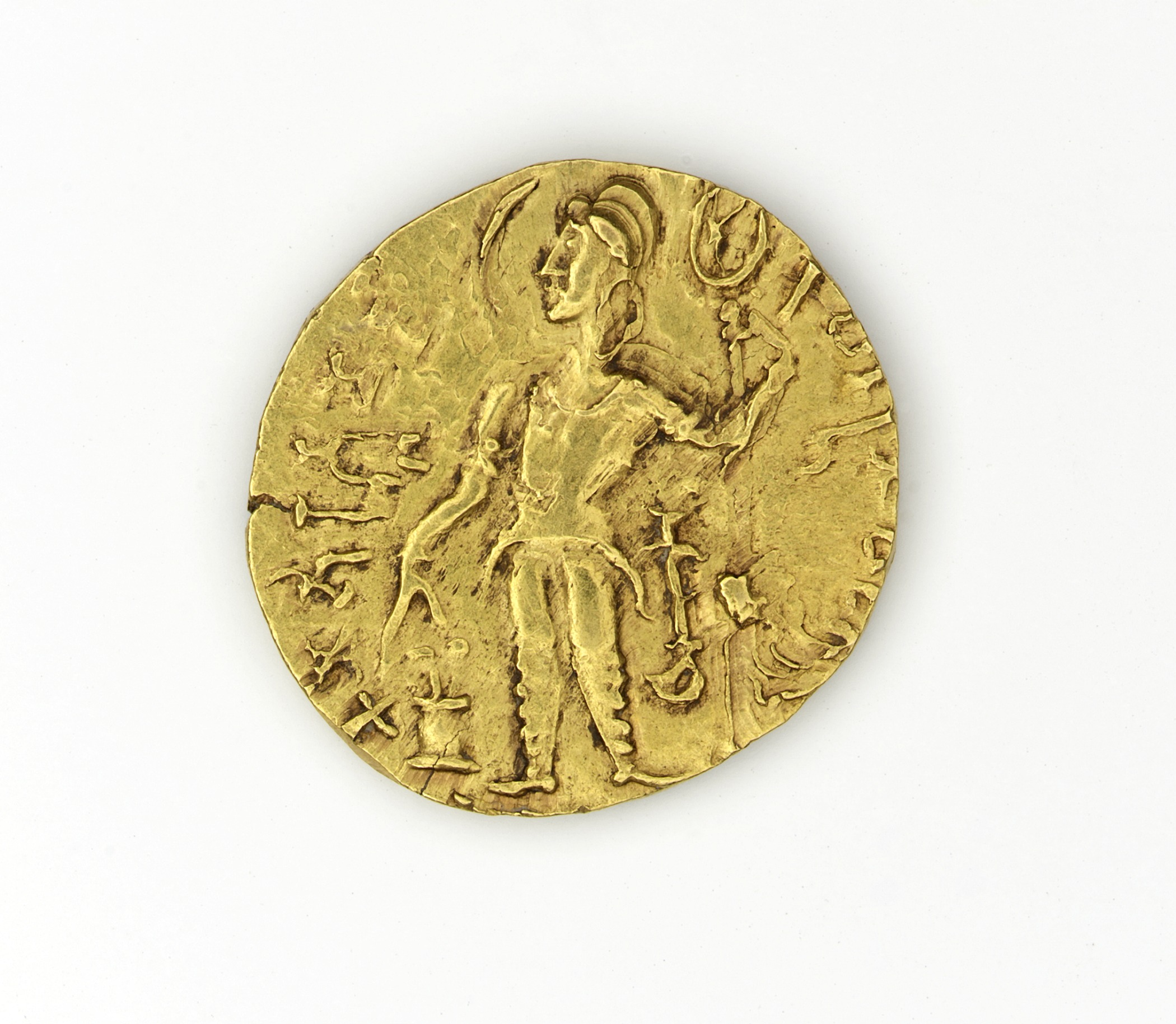
A coin of Kacha

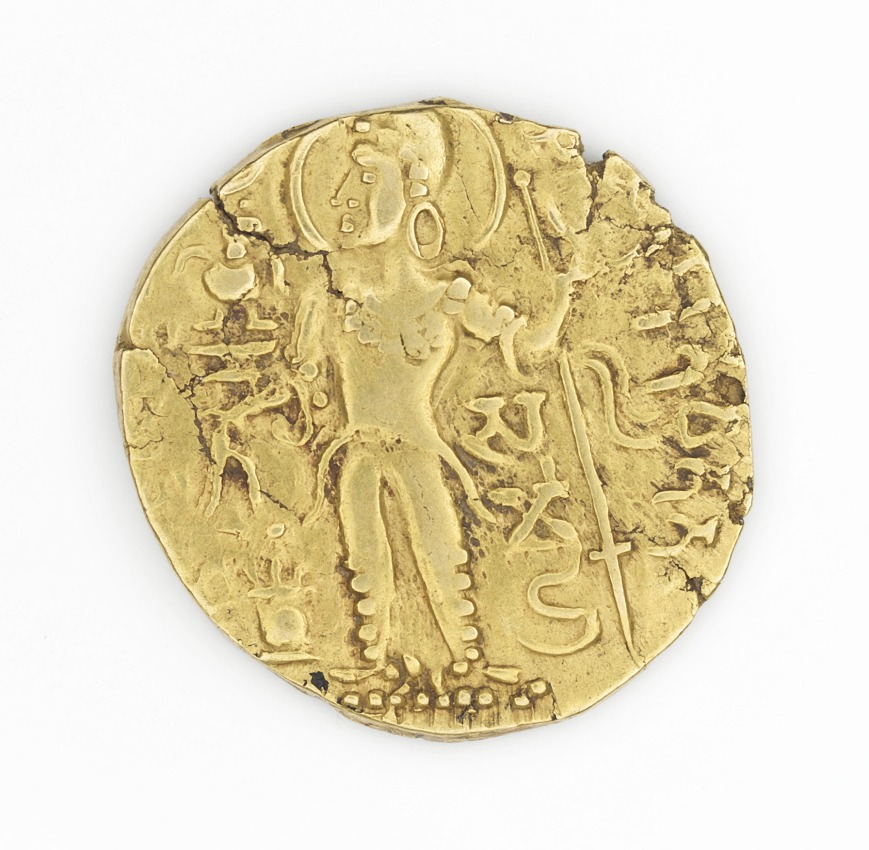
A coin of Samudragupta

=== Rival brother of Samudragupta ===
According to another theory, Kacha was a rival claimant to the throne, possibly a brother of Samudragupta. He probably occupied the throne for a brief period, before being dethroned by Samudragupta. A variation of this theory is that Kacha outlived Samudragupta, and took control of Magadha after his death, while the authority of Samudragupta's son Ramagupta was confined to Malwa.

Arguments cited in favour of this theory include:

- A verse in the Allahabad Pillar inscription of Samudragupta depicts a court scene where Chandragupta I nominates Samudragupta as his successor, leading to a "melancholy look" on some faces. This suggests that there were rival claimants to the throne, and may be considered as an indirect reference to Kacha.
- The king's dress and the device of the king offering an incense on Kacha's coins seem to be inspired by the coins of the Kushan Empire, which ruled northern India in the preceding centuries. On the other hand, Samudragupta's coins are Indian in character. Thus, Kacha's coins are less original than those of Samudragupta, and therefore, Kacha must have preceded Samudragupta.
- The 8th-9th century work Arya-manju-shri-mula-kalpa mentions a king called Bhasma, who was the younger brother of king Samudra. Samudra may be identified with Samudragupta, and Bhasma can be identified with Kacha, because the Sanskrit words "kacha" and "bhasma" both literally mean "alkaline ashes". Based on this identification, L. P. Pandey credits Kacha with expanding the Gupta kingdom up to Kashmir.
- The Kaliyuga-raja-vrttanta section of the Bhavishyottara Purana mentions that Kacha was a son of Chandragupta I from a Licchavi princess. It states that he helped his father supplant the Andhras on the throne of Magadha. It describes Kacha as jointly ruling with his father, and states that Samudragupta killed their father.
- Kacha was seen as a usurper by Samudragupta's descendants, because of which the inscriptions of the subsequent Gupta kings must have omitted his name from the genealogical lists.

Criticism of this theory includes:

- The Allahabad Pillar inscription does not state that the people disappointed at Samudragupta's ascension were his brothers: it only mentions that they were from families of equal rank. The inscription does not state that these people revolted against him.
- The Samudra and Bhasma of Arya-manju-shri-mula-kalpa cannot be identified as Samudragupta and Kacha. The text states that Bhasma's elder brother Samudra was an evil person, who obtained the kingdom for three days. Bhasma, too, was a cruel and evil ruler, and his kingdom was full of wretched Brahmanas. He obtained riches of various kinds, and marched westwards to the doorstep of Kashmir. There, he won a battle, and ruled for 12 years and 15 [sic] months. Towards the end of his life, he suffered from a disease, which caused him to faint repeatedly.
  - Samudra ruled for three days (or perhaps, three years), while Samudragupta ruled for over three decades.
  - Kacha's coins describe him as a performer of "excellent deeds", while Arya-manju-shri-mula-kalpa describes Bhasma as an evil king. Such a glaring discrepancy cannot simply be explained as the negative attitude of the text's Buddhist writer towards a non-Buddhist king.
  - There is no evidence that Samudragupta had a brother named Bhasma, who ruled for over 12 years.
  - The text does not state that Bhasma rebelled against Samudra.
  - The list of succeeding kings mentioned in the text does not tally with the Gupta genealogy.
- The portion of Kaliyuga-raja-vrttanta that describes the early Gupta history is clearly a modern forgery.
- There is no concrete evidence that Kacha's coins precede those of Samudragupta: their similarity to the Kushan archetype does not necessarily mean that Kacha preceded Samudragupta.

=== Another person depicted on Samudragupta's coins ===
==== Kacha of Ajanta inscription ====
The Ajanta Cave XVII inscription mentions a ruler named Kacha, who was the son and successor of Upendragupta. Historian M. J. Sharma speculated that this Kacha was related to Samudragupta through his wife Dattadevi, and helped Samudragupta in a war of succession following the death of Chandragupta I. According to Sharma's theory, the coins that depict Kacha were issued by Samudragupta as a mark of respect towards Kacha: one side of these coins mentions Kacha, the other side describes Samudragupta. The Gupta emperor appointed Kacha as his governor of Airikina (modern Eran).

Criticism of this theory includes:

- It is unlikely that an emperor issued coins in name of his subordinate.
- There is no evidence to show that the Kacha of Ajanta Cave inscription was a subordinate of Samudragupta.
- There is hardly any evidence connecting Kacha with Airikina: Sharma's assertions are based on a flawed reading of the inscription's text.

==== Samudragupta's martyred brother ====
Historian R. D. Banerji speculated that Kacha was a brother of Samudragupta, and died fighting "a war of liberation" against the Kushan Empire during the reign of their father Chandragupta I. According to this theory, the coins attributed to Kacha were actually commemorative medals issued by Samudragupta to commemorate his brother.

However, there is no proof that Magadha was a part of the Kushan Empire during the first quarter of the 4th century, when the Guptas rose to power. Moreover, there is no concrete proof that Samudragupta had a brother named Kacha, who died fighting against the Kushan forces. Finally, no ancient Indian kings are known to have stuck such commemorative medals.

=== Ramagupta ===
Some scholars, such as K. P. Jayaswal and D. R. Bhandarkar, identified Kacha with Ramagupta, who according to the Sanskrit play Devichandraguptam, was a brother of Chandragupta II, and thus a son of Samudragupta.. The proponents of this theory argued that Kacha's coins are similar to the coins that were issued by Samudragupta during the later part of his reign, such as his Ashvamedha and tiger-slayer coins. However, there is no concrete evidence that Kacha's coins are of a later date than those of Samudragupta.

A. S. Altekar also once supported this identification, theorizing that the name "Kacha" (Kāca) was converted to "Rāma" because of scribal mistakes. However, he later withdrew his opinion after the discovery of coins attributed to Ramagupta, in Malwa. The discovery of three stone inscriptions referring to Ramagupta also nullified this theory.

Numismatist Sanjeev Kumar identifies Kacha with Ramagupta based on a copper coin discovered in the Vidisha area. The obverse of this coin shows an Ashvamedha horse with the Brahmi text "Kācha", and the reverse reads "Rāmagupta Ma[harāja]". Kumar theorizes that the Ramagupta served as the governor of Vidisha and issued copper coins during the reign of his father Samudragupta. After the death of his father around 378 CE, he conducted an Ashvamedha ceremony, and declared himself the king assuming the regnal name Kācha. His younger brother Chandragupta II later killed him, and the play Devichandragupta was written as propaganda aimed at covering up this assassination.

=== Ghatotkacha ===
James Prinsep identified Kacha with Ghatotkacha, the grandfather of Samudragupta, based on the similarity of two names. However, Ghatotkacha was a pre-imperial ruler of the dynasty, and it is unlikely that he issued any gold coins. The legend "exterminator of all kings" on Kacha's coins does not befit a non-imperial ruler like him.

Moreover, the Sanskrit words "Kacha" (Kāca) and "Ghatotkacha" (Ghaṭotkaca) have completely different meanings: there is little scope for contraction of the name "Ghatotkacha" to "Kacha".

=== A non-Gupta usurper ===
B. S. Sitholey theorized that Kacha was a non-Gupta "political adventurer" who usurped the throne, when Samudragupta was busy in his southern campaigns, and was defeated by Samudragupta when the latter returned to the capital. Sitholey argues that the absence of Kacha's name in literary and epigraphic sources proves that he was an outsider.

However, there is no concrete evidence for this: it is common for princes of collateral branches to be excluded from royal genealogies, which describe the ancestry of the current king, not the succession of the previous kings. Also, whenever Kacha's coins have been discovered in a hoard, they have always been found among coins issued by other Gupta kings. For example, the Bayana hoard contains 1621 gold coins including 16 Kacha coins: all other coins in this hoard were issued by persons known to be Gupta kings. This suggests that Kacha was affiliated with the Gupta dynasty.
