= Chandragupta I =

Gupta emperor from 319 to 335

- Maharajadhiraja
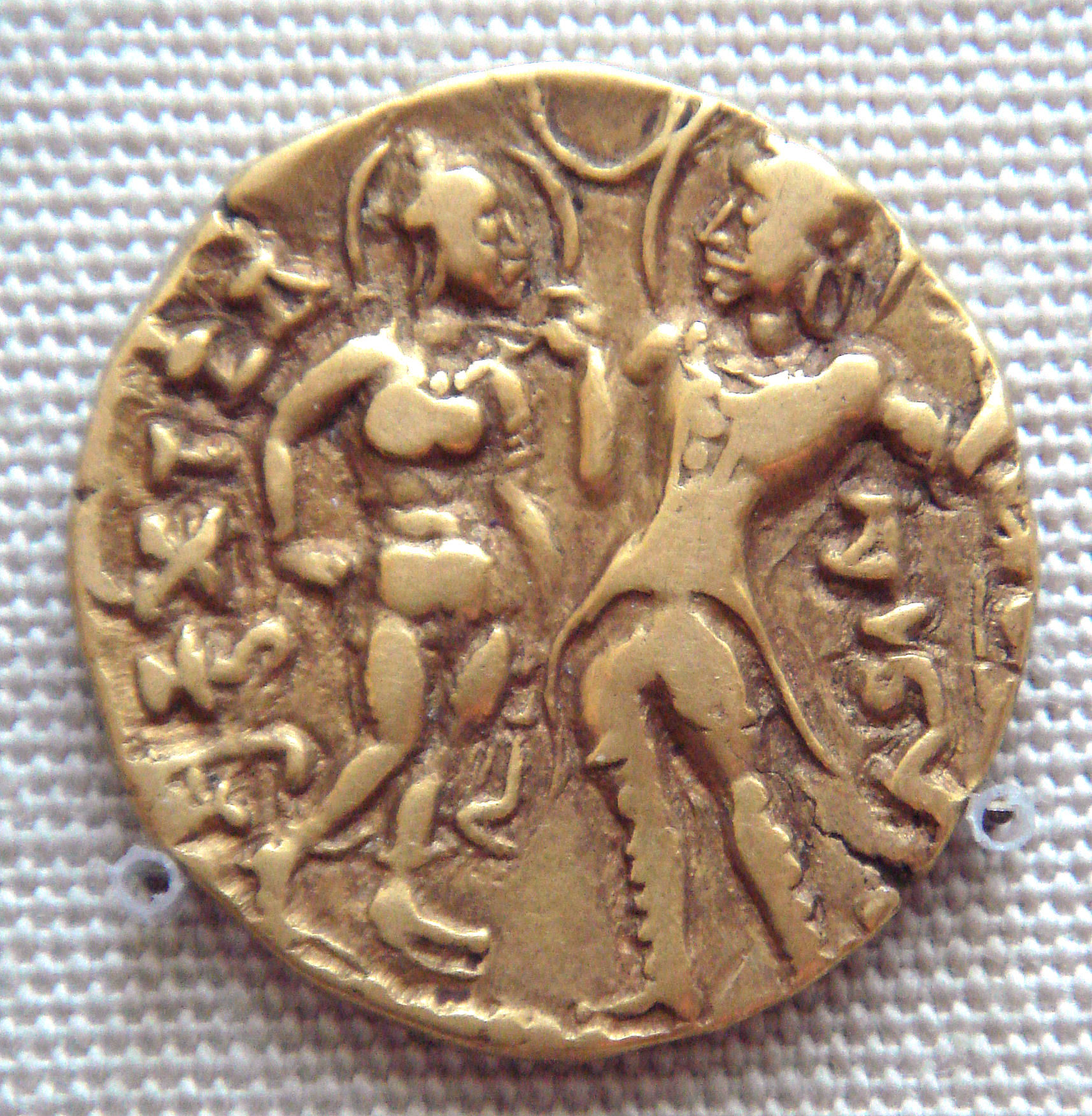
- A coin depicting Chandragupta and Kumaradevi. The name Chandra(-gupta) appears vertically under the left arm of the emperor. This unique coin type of Chandragupta I was probably issued by his successor Samudragupta as a commemorative issue.

Gupta emperor
- Reign: c. 319 – c. 335
- Coronation: 26 February 320
- Predecessor: Ghatotkacha
- Successor: possibly Kacha
- Co-ruler: Kumaradevi
- Died: 335
- Spouse: Kumaradevi
- Issue: Samudragupta, Possibly Kacha
- House: Gupta Empire
- Dynasty: Gupta
- Father: Ghatotkacha
- Religion: Hinduism

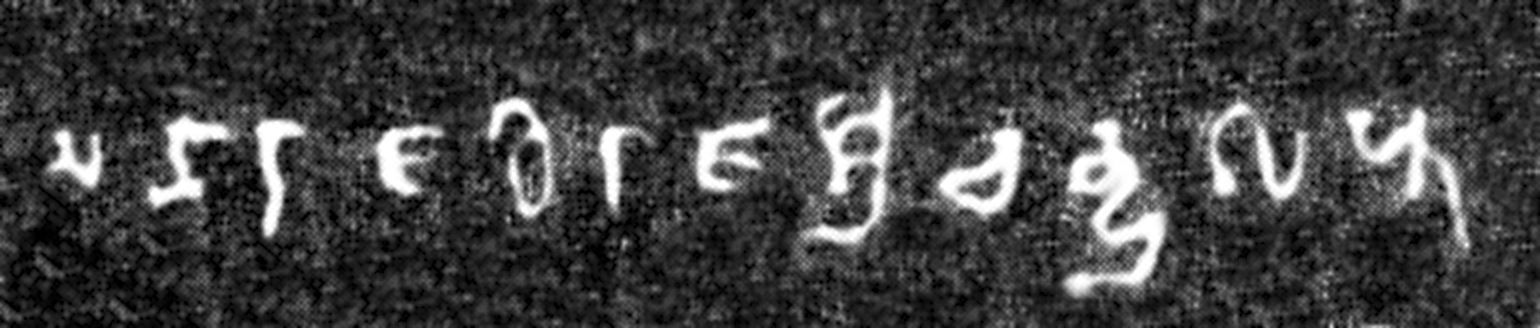
Inscription Mahārājadhirāja Shrī Chandragupta ("Great King of Kings, Lord Chandragupta") in the Gupta script, in the Samudragupta inscription on the Allahabad pillar.

Chandragupta I (Gupta script: Cha-ndra-gu-pta, r. c. 319–335) was a monarch of the Gupta Empire, who ruled in northern and central India. His title "Mahārājadhirāja" (lit. 'Great king of kings') suggests that he was the first suzerain ruler of the dynasty. It is not certain how he turned his small ancestral kingdom into an empire, although a widely accepted theory among modern historians is that his marriage to the Licchavi princess Kumaradevi helped him extend his political power. Their son Samudragupta further expanded the Gupta Empire.

== Period of reign ==
Chandragupta was a son of the Gupta king Ghatotkacha, and a grandson of the dynasty's founder Gupta, both of whom are called Maharaja ("great king") in the Allahabad Pillar inscription. Chandragupta assumed the title Maharajadhiraja ( "great king of kings") and issued gold coins, which suggests that he was the first imperial ruler of the dynasty.

Chandragupta certainly reigned in the first quarter of the 4th century, but the exact period of his reign is uncertain. His assumption of the title Maharajadhiraja has led to suggestions that he founded the Gupta calendar era, and that the epoch of this era marks his coronation. Based on this argument, several historians, including V. A. Smith and P. L. Gupta, date Chandragupta's ascension to 319–320, which they believe to be the beginning of the Gupta era. However, this is merely an assumption, and the identity of the founder of the Gupta era is not certain. Some historians, such as D. C. Sircar and R. C. Majumdar, theorize that the Gupta era marks the coronation of his son Samudragupta. S. R. Goyal theorizes that the era was started by the later king Chandragupta II, but its beginning was dated to Samudragupta's ascension.

Chandragupta I probably had a long reign, as the Allahabad Pillar inscription suggests that he appointed his son as his successor, presumably after reaching an old age. However, the exact period of his reign is debated.

Various estimates for Chandragupta's reign include:

- A. S. Altekar: 305–325
- S. R. Goyal: 319–350
- Tej Ram Sharma: 319–353
- Upinder Singh: 319-335/336

== Marriage to Kumaradevi ==
Chandragupta married the Lichchhavi princess Kumaradevi. Licchavi is the name of an ancient clan that was headquartered at Vaishali in present-day Bihar during the time of Gautama Buddha. A Lichchhavi kingdom existed in the present-day Nepal in the first millennium CE. However, the identity of Kumaradevi's Lichchhavi kingdom is not certain.

An 8th-century inscription of the Lichchhavi dynasty of Nepal claims that their legendary ancestor Supushpa was born in the royal family of Pushpapura, that is, Pataliputra in Magadha. According to some historians, such as V. A. Smith, the Lichchhavis ruled at Pataliputra during Samudragupta's time. However, this inscription states that Supushpa ruled 38 generations before the 5th-century king Manadeva, that is, centuries before Chandragupta's period. Therefore, the claim made in this inscription, even if true, cannot be taken as concrete evidence of the Lichchhavi rule at Pataliputra during Chandragupta's time.

The Lichchhavi kingdom of Kumaradevi is unlikely to have been located in present-day Nepal because Samudragupta's Allahabad Pillar inscription mentions Nepala (that is, Nepal) as a distinct, subordinate kingdom. Given the lack of any other evidence, historian R. C. Majumdar assumed that during Chandragupta's time, the Lichchhavis ruled at Vaishali, which is the only other base of the clan known from the historical records.

=== Impact of marriage ===
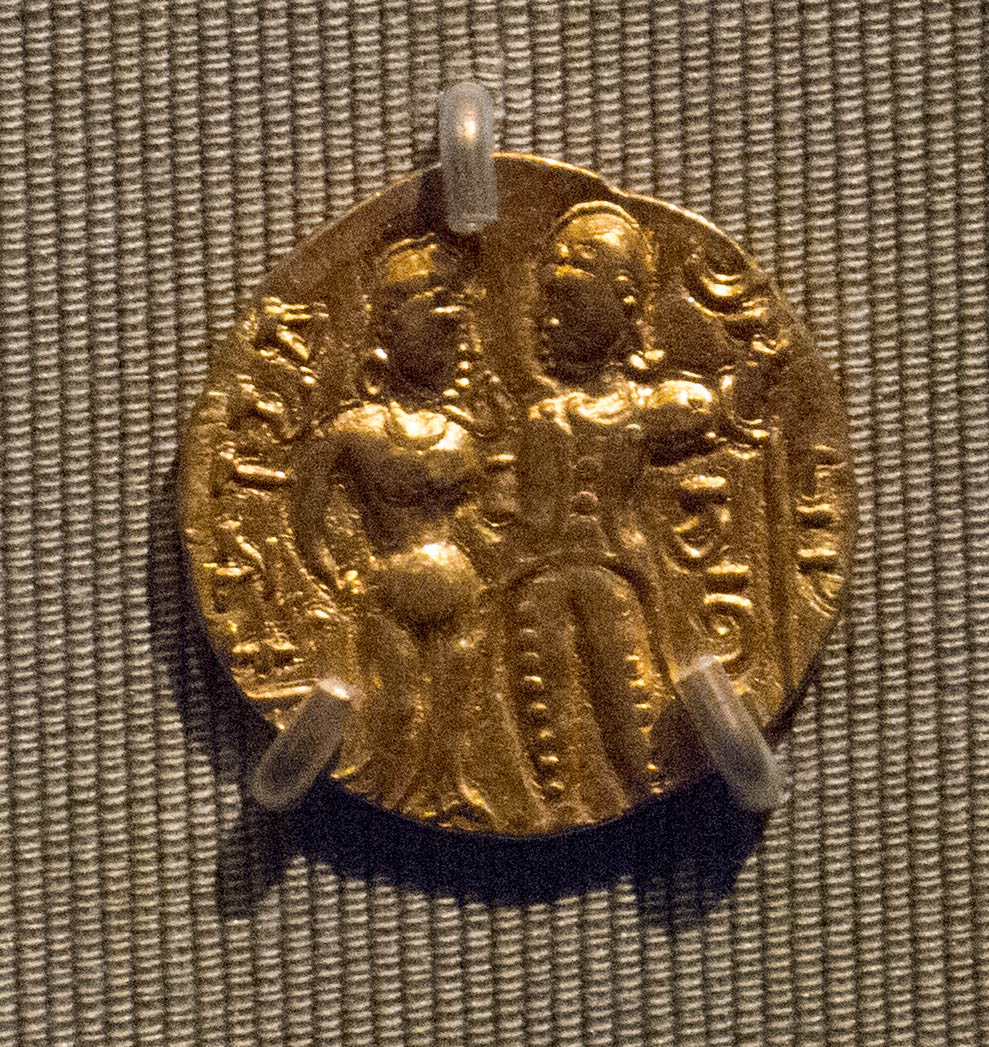
A coin depicting Chandragupta and Kumaradevi

The gold coins attributed to Chandragupta bear portraits of Chandragupta and Kumaradevi, and the legend Lichchhavayah ("the Lichchhavis"). Their son Samudragupta is described as Lichchhavi-dauhitra ("Lichchhavi daughter's son") in the Gupta inscriptions. Except Kumaradevi, these inscriptions do not mention the paternal family of the dynasty's queens, which suggests that the Gupta family considered Kumaradevi's marriage to Chandragupta an important event.

Numismatist John Allan theorized that Chandragupta defeated a Lichchhavi kingdom headquartered at Vaishali, and that Kumaradevi's marriage to him happened as part of a peace treaty. He suggested that the Guptas considered this marriage a prestigious one simply because of the ancient lineage of the Lichchhavis. However, the ancient text Manusamhita regards the Lichchhavis as "unorthodox and impure" (vratya). Therefore, it is unlikely that the Guptas proudly mentioned Samudragupta's Lichchhavi ancestry to increase their social prestige. Also, it is unlikely that the Guptas allowed the name of the Lichchhavis to appear on the dynasty's coins after defeating them.

It is more likely that the marriage helped Chandragupta extend his political power and dominions, enabling him to adopt the title Maharajadhiraja. The appearance of the Lichchhavis' name on the coins is probably symbolic of their contribution to the expansion of the Gupta power. After the marriage, Chandragupta probably became the ruler of the Lichchhavi territories. Alternatively, it is possible that the Gupta and the Lichchhavi states formed a union, with Chandragupta and Kumaradevi being regarded as the sovereign rulers of their respective states, until the reign of their son Samudragupta, who became the sole ruler of the united kingdom.

== Extent of kingdom ==
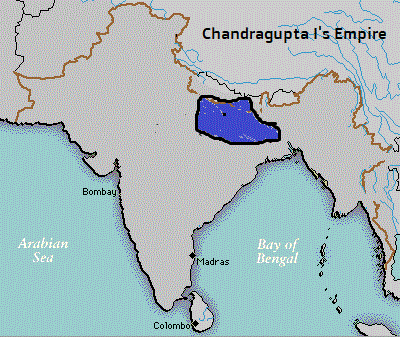
Possible extent of the Gupta Empire under Chandragupta I

Little is known about Chandragupta other than his ancestry, his marriage, and his expansion of the Gupta power, as evident from his title Maharajadhiraja. The territorial extent of Chandragupta's kingdom is not known, but it must have been substantially larger than that of the earlier Gupta kings, as Chandragupta bore the title Maharajadhiraja. Modern historians have attempted to determine the extent of his kingdom based on the information from the Puranas and the Allahabad Pillar inscription issued by his son Samudragupta.

The Allahabad Pillar inscription names several kings subjugated by Samudragupta. Based on the identity of these kings, several modern historians have tried to determine the extent of the territory that he must have inherited from Chandragupta. For example, since the king of the northern part of the Bengal region is not mentioned among the kings subjugated by Samudragupta, these historians theorize that northern Bengal was a part of Chandragupta's kingdom. However, such conclusions cannot be made with certainty, as the identity of several of the kings subjugated by Samudragupta is a matter of debate. Nevertheless, the information from the inscription can be used to determine the territories that were not a part of Chandragupta's kingdom:

- In the west, Chandragupta's kingdom probably did not extend much beyond Prayaga (modern Prayagraja), as Samudragupta defeated the kings of present-day western Uttar Pradesh.
- In the south, Chandragupta's kingdom did not include the Mahakoshala area of Central India, as Samudragupta defeated the kings of the forest region, which is identified with this area.
- In the east, Chandragupta's kingdom did not include southern Bengal, because the Allahabad Pillar inscription mentions Samatata in that region as a frontier kingdom. Moreover, the Delhi Iron Pillar inscription suggests that Vanga kingdom in that region was conquered by the later king Chandragupta II.
- In the north, the Allahabad Pillar inscription mentions Nepala (in present-day Nepal) as a frontier kingdom.

A passage in the Vayu Purana states that the Guptas ruled over Saketa (modern Ayodhya), Prayaga, and Magadha. Based on this, multiple modern scholars have theorized that Chandragupta ruled over these territories. However, this conclusion is not certain, as the Vayu Purana does not mention the name of a specific ruler. Scholars critical of this theory argue that the passage describes the territories of either the dynasty's founder Gupta or its 6th century rulers who oversaw the kingdom's decline. Critics also point out that the corresponding passage in the Vishnu Purana states that the Guptas and the Magadhas jointly ruled over Prayaga and Magadha, and does not mention Saketa at all. The corresponding passage in the various manuscripts of Bhagavata Purana either does not mention the word "Gupta", or uses it as a common noun meaning "protected" instead of using it as the name of a specific dynasty. Even somes manuscripts of the Vayu Purana use the words "Guhya", "Sapta" or "Manidhanyaka" instead of "Gupta". Supporters of the theory dismiss these as scribal mistakes. Historian Ashvini Agrawal argues that the Vayu Purana passage cannot be a reference to the Gupta territories during the empire's period of decline, as it does not mention Bengal, which formed a part of the Gupta kingdom during this period.

According to historian R. C. Majumdar, Chandragupta's kingdom may have included the whole of present-day Bihar, and a part of present-day Uttar Pradesh and Bengal. Historian Dilip Kumar Ganguly believes that he ruled a large kingdom extending from Allahabad in the west to the Ganga river in Bengal in the east; the kingdom excluded south-eastern Bengal (Samatata), southern Bengal (Vanga), eastern Bengal, and western Bengal (the kingdom of Chandravarman). Historian Ashvini Agarwal states that his kingdom included central and eastern Uttar Pradesh (including Prayaga and Awadh), and Bihar; but not Bengal.

== Coinage ==
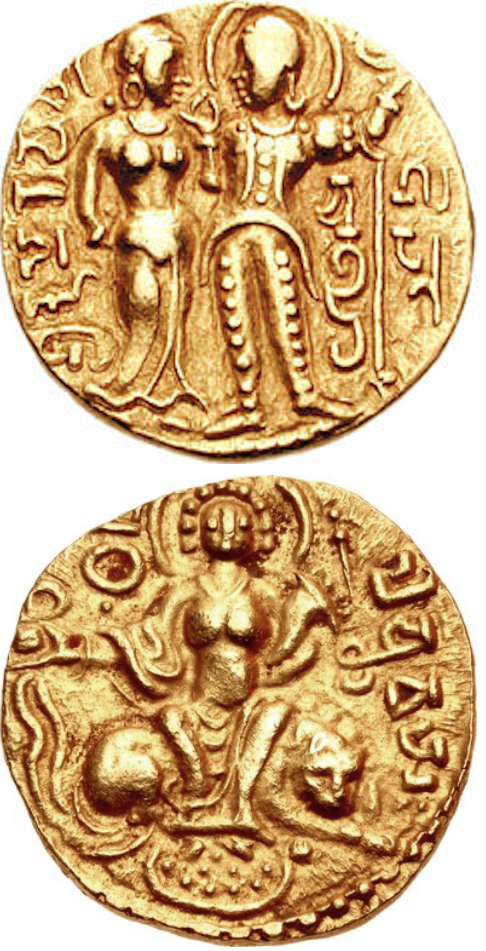
Obverse and reverse of the commemorative Chandragupta and Kumaradevi type. Obverse: Kumaradeva and Chandragupta standing, legend to the left Śrī Kumāradevā, to the right / Cha-ndra/gu-pta vertically. Reverse: Goddess seated on lion, with the legend 𑁊 Li-ccha-va-yah.

Gold coins bearing portraits of Chandragupta and Kumaradevi have been discovered at Mathura, Ayodhya, Lucknow, Sitapur, Tanda, Ghazipur, and Varanasi in Uttar Pradesh; Bayana in Rajasthan; and Hajipur in Bihar. The obverse of these coins depicts portraits of Chandragupta and Kumaradevi, with their names in the Gupta script. The reverse shows a goddess seated on a lion, with the legend "Li-ccha-va-yah" (𑁊, "the Lichchhavis").

Various scholars, including numismatist John Allan, have considered that the gold coins bearing the portraits of Chandragupta and Kumaradevi were issued by Samudragupta to commemorate his parents, while others have attributed the issue of these coins to Chandragupta himself, or even suggested that these coins were issued by the Lichchhavis.

V. S. Pathak theorized that the coins show the royal couple in the vaivahika (nuptial) pose, but there is no concrete evidence that the coins depict the royal wedding. S.V. Sohoni theorized that the coins depicted Chandragupta taking leave of Kumaradevi while going on a military campaign, but this is doubtful given the lack of a phrase indicative of military prowess (unlike the coins of their son Samudragupta). The coins probably simply depict Chandragupta and Kumaradevi as joint rulers.

The identity of the female figure appearing on the reverse of these coins is uncertain. It is unlikely that she was a Gupta queen, as the depiction of a female figure seated on a lion is characteristic of a goddess in historical art of India. Some historians, such as A. S. Altekar, have identified the goddess as Durga. However, although Durga is often represented as seated on a lion, this attribute is not unique to her: Lakshmi has also been depicted as seated on a lion. For example, Hemadri's works mention Simha-vahini ("having lion as her vahana") Lakshmi, and images from Khajuraho depict Simha-vahini Gajalakshmi. Some scholars, such as John Allan, have identified the goddess on the coins as Lakshmi, who is the goddess of fortune and the wife of Vishnu. She may have been featured on the coins as a symbol of the Guptas' royal prosperity, or as a mark of their Vaishnavite affiliation, but this cannot be said with certainty. The goddess may also have been a tutelary goddess of the Lichchhavis, whose name appears below her image, but this cannot be said with certainty either.

== Successor ==
The Allahabad Pillar inscription and the Eran stone inscription of Samudragupta state that his father Chandragupta selected him as the next king. The Allahabad Pillar inscription states that Chandragupta appointed him to "protect the earth", which suggests that Chandragupta renounced the throne in his old age, and appointed his son as the next king.

The discovery of the coins issued by a Gupta ruler named Kacha have led to some debate about Chandragupta's successor. According to one theory, Kacha was another name for Samudragupta. Another theory is that Kacha was the elder brother of Samudragupta, and succeeded their father Chandragupta.

The Kaliyuga-raja-vrttanta section of the Bhavishyottara Purana mentions that Kacha was a son of Chandragupta I from a Licchavi princess. It describes Kacha as jointly ruling with his father, and states that Samudragupta killed their father. However, these passages (and possibly the entire text) are a modern forgery.
