= Ghatotkacha (king) =

King of northern India (died c. 319)

- Maharaja; Shri
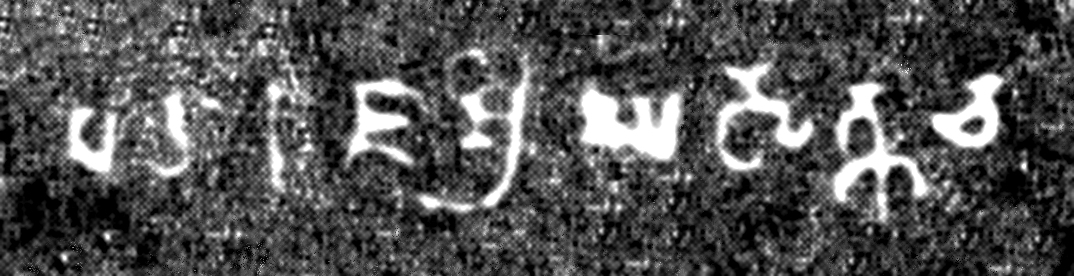
- Mahārāja Shrī Ghatotkacha inscription in Gupta script, on the Allahabad pillar inscription of Samudragupta.

Gupta King
- Reign: c. 280 CE – 319 CE
- Predecessor: Gupta
- Successor: Chandragupta I
- Died: c. 319 CE
- Issue: Chandragupta I
- Dynasty: Gupta
- Father: Gupta

Ghatotkacha (Gupta script: Gha-to-tka-cha, IAST: Ghaṭotkaca, r. c. late 3rd century - early 4th century) was a pre-imperial Gupta king of northern India. He was a son of the dynasty's founder Gupta, and the father of the dynasty's first emperor Chandragupta I.

== Sources ==
Ghatotkacha was a son of Gupta, the founder of the Gupta dynasty. Like his father, Ghatotkacha is not attested by his own inscriptions. The earliest description of him occurs in his grandson Samudragupta's Allahabad Pillar inscription, and is repeated verbatim in several later records of the dynasty. Earlier scholars attributed a gold coin and a clay seal to him, but these are now unanimously assigned to Ghatotkacha-gupta, who was a son or a younger brother of the 5th century Gupta ruler Kumaragupta I.

== Period ==
Modern historians date the beginning of the Gupta calendar era to 318-319 CE. This era probably marks the ascension of Chandragupta I to the Gupta throne, which means that Ghatotkacha's reign ended around this time.

The beginning of his reign is uncertain. Various estimates of his reign include:

- R. K. Mukherjee: 280-319 CE
- A. S. Altekar: 290-305 CE
- Tej Ram Sharma: 295-319 CE
- V. A. Smith: 300-320 CE
- Numismatist P. L. Gupta and historian S. R. Goyal: 300-319 CE

== Political status ==
The Allahabad Pillar inscription uses the title Maharaja ("Great King") for Gupta and Ghatotkacha, as opposed to the title Maharajadhiraja ("king of great kings") for Ghatotkacha's son Chandragupta I. In the later period, the title Maharaja was used by feudatory rulers, which has led to suggestions that Gupta and Ghatotkacha were feudatory kings. However, there are several instances of paramount sovereigns using the title Maharaja, in both pre-Gupta and post-Gupta periods, so this cannot be said with certainty. That said, there is no doubt that Gupta and Ghatotkacha held a lower status and were less powerful than Chandragupta I.

== Reign ==
Ghatotkacha may have been responsible for entering into a matrimonial alliance with the Lichchhavis, which resulted in the marriage of the Lichchhavi princess Kumaradevi to his son Chandragupta I. Historian V. A. Smith dates this event to c. 308 CE. The Gupta inscriptions do not mention the paternal family of the dynasty's queens with the exception of Kumaradevi, which suggests that the Gupta family considered Kumaradevi's marriage to Chandragupta as an important event.

Historian H. C. Raychaudhuri theorized that some of the Mahabharata stories describing the sins of the legendary character Ghatotkacha were omitted in the final redaction of the epic out of respect for the Gupta king Ghatotkacha.
