= Gupta (king) =

3rd-century CE founder of Gupta dynasty of northern India

- Maharaja; Shri
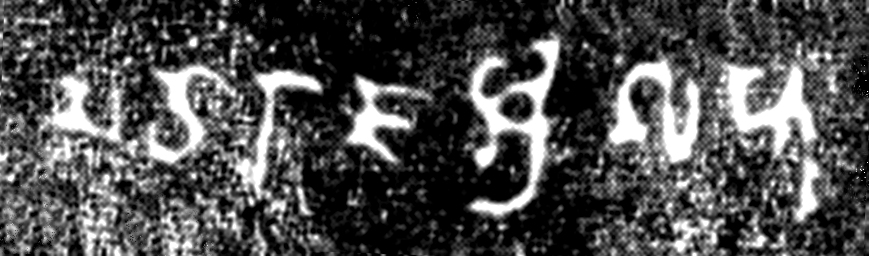
- Mahārāja Shrī Gupta ("Great King, Lord Gupta") in Gupta script on the Allahabad pillar inscription of Samudragupta, where Samudragupta presents king Gupta as his great-grandfather.

Gupta King
- Reign: c. late 3rd century
- Successor: Ghatotkacha
- Issue: Ghatotkacha
- Dynasty: Gupta

Gupta (Gupta script: Gu-pta, fl. late 3rd century CE) was the founder of the Gupta dynasty in eastern India. He is identified with king Che-li-ki-to (believed to be the Chinese transcription of "Shri-Gupta"), who, according to the 7th-century Chinese Buddhist monk Yijing, built a temple near Mi-li-kia-si-kia-po-no (Mṛgaśikhāvana) for Chinese pilgrims. This temple was located somewhere in eastern India: based on the identification of its location, modern scholars variously locate Gupta's territory in present-day eastern Uttar Pradesh or Bengal region.

== Name ==
Gupta is not attested by his own inscriptions or coins, although some seals and coins have been wrongly attributed to him. The earliest description of him occurs in his great-grandson Samudragupta's Prayagraaj Pillar inscription, and is repeated verbatim in several later records of the dynasty:

Samudragupta the Mahārājādhirāja, son of the prosperous Chandragupta (I), the Mahārājādhirāja, born of the Mahādēvī Kumāradēvī, (and) daughter's son of the Licchavi, son's son of the prosperous Ghaṭōtkacha, the Mahārāja and the son of the son's son of the prosperous Gupta, the Mahārāja

The Allahabad Pillar inscription names Samudragupta's ancestors as Shrī Gupta ( shri gu-pta), Shrī Ghatotkacha, and Shrī Chandragupta. Some earlier scholars thought that the name of the dynasty's founder was "Shri-gupta" (IAST: Śrigupta), as Gupta does not appear to be a given name. However, it is now generally agreed that Shri is an honorific title and not an integral part of the king's name; "Gupta" was the actual name of the king. The Vishnu Sahasranama mentions Gupta among the 1008 names of Vishnu, which suggests that it can be used as a given name. The name derives from the word gup ("to protect").

== Date ==
Gupta most probably ruled in the second half of the 3rd century, although his reign cannot be dated with certainty based on existing evidence. Various estimates of his reign include:

- R. K. Mukherjee: c. 240–280 CE
- A. S. Altekar: c. 270–290 CE
- V. A. Smith: c. 275–300 CE
- Tej Ram Sharma: c. 275–295 CE
- S. R. Goel: c. 295–300 CE

== Political status ==
The Allahabad Pillar inscription uses the title Maharaja ( "Great King") for Gupta and his son Ghatotkacha, as opposed to the title Maharajadhiraja ("king of great kings") for later ruler Chandragupta I. In the later period, the title Maharaja was used by feudatory rulers, which has led to suggestions that Gupta and Ghatotkacha were feudatory kings. For example, scholars R. D. Banerji and K. P. Jayaswal theorize that they were Kushana vassals.

There is no doubt that Gupta and Ghatotkacha held a lower status and were less powerful than Chandragupta I. However, there are several instances of paramount sovereigns using the title Maharaja, in both pre-Gupta and post-Gupta periods, so the use of the title Maharaja cannot be considered as conclusive evidence of Gupta's vassal status. The sovereign kings of several contemporary or near-contemporary dynasties, including the Vakatakas, used the title Maharaja. Moreover, the Kushana Empire had already declined before the rise of the Guptas, so Gupta is unlikely to have been a Kushana vassal.

== Identification with Che-li-ki-to ==
The 7th century Chinese Buddhist monk Yijing, in his description of the itinerary of the earlier Korean traveler(of Silla) Hwui-lun(慧輪) alias Prajnavarma, mentions that in ancient times, king Che-li-ki-to (室利笈多) built a temple near Mi-li-kia-si-kia-po-no (Mṛgaśikhāvana) for Chinese pilgrims. The king endowed the temple with the revenue of 24 villages for its maintenance. Only the brick foundation of this temple survived in Yijing's time.

Numismatist John Allan read Che-li-ki-to as a transcription of Shri-Gupta. J. F. Fleet opposed this theory, pointing out that according to Yijing's writings, Che-li-ki-to flourished five hundred years before him (that is, in the second century), while Gupta ruled in the late 3rd century. Moreover, the Gupta inscriptions mention the king's name as "Gupta" (which would be transcribed as ki-to, 笈多), not "Shri-gupta" (Che-li-ki-to). Allan argued that Yijing's statement about the king's date should not be taken literally, and that the Chinese writers visiting India often used "Shri" as an honorific.

Based on available evidence, Gupta's religious affiliation is unclear. Historian A. K. Narain theorizes that he was a Vaishnavite, who was tolerant of Buddhist activity in his kingdom. This latter scenario would have been comparable with the later Gupta monarchs, who were predominantly Vaishnavite, but under whose regimes heterodox religious movements like Buddhism and Jainism were allowed to flourish.

== Territory ==
Some scholars, such as D. C. Ganguly and R. C. Majumdar, have interpreted Yijing's description to mean that the temple was located more than 40 yojanas east of Nalanda, along the Ganga river, and have identified its location in present-day Bengal region. Majumdar read Mi-li-kia-si-kia-po-no as a transcription of Mriga-sthapana, the name of a stupa which was located in the historical Varendra region of Bengal. According to Ganguly, this suggests that the Gupta dynasty originated in Bengal, while according to Majumdar, this only proves that Bengal was a part of Gupta's kingdom.

Other scholars, such as B. P. Sinha and Jagannath Agrawal, read Mi-li-kia-si-kia-po-no of Yijing's account as a transcription of Mriga-shikha-vana (IAST: Mṛgaśikhāvana), and identify it with Mrigadaya (Deer Park) in Sarnath, in present-day eastern Uttar Pradesh. Ashvini Agrawal argues that Mi-li-kia-si-kia-po-no is not an exact transcription of Mriga-sthapana: Mriga-shikha-vana is closer, and a different interpretation of Yijing's writings suggests that Mi-li-kia-si-kia-po-no was located in Sarnath. Sinha theorizes that Hwui-lun erroneously mentioned its location as east of Nalanda. These historians propose that the Gupta dynasty originated in eastern Uttar Pradesh.
