= Mṛgaśikhāvana =

Buddhist site in eastern India

Mi-li-kia-si-kia-po-no, believed to be a Chinese transcription of Mṛgaśikhāvana (Mriga-shikha-vana), was the site of a Buddhist establishment in eastern India. It is mentioned in the writings of the Chinese traveler Yijing, who states that king Che-li-ki-to (identified with the 3rd century king Gupta) had constructed a temple for Chinese Buddhist pilgrims near it.

== Yijing's description ==
Yijing mentions Mṛgaśikhāvana (as "Mi-li-kia-si-kia-po-no") while describing the itinerary of the earlier Korean traveler Hwui-lun alias Prajnavarma, stating that in ancient times, king Che-li-ki-to built a temple for Chinese pilgrims near it. The king is said to have endowed the temple with the revenue of 24 villages for its maintenance. Only the brick foundation of this temple survived in Yijing's time.

== Location ==
Proposed locations (marked as star) of Mṛgaśikhāvana, with Nalanda shown in the centre

=== Translations of Yijing's work ===
Contradictory translations of Yijing's Kau-fa-kao-sang-chuen, which refers to Mṛgaśikhāvana, have led to debates among historians about its exact location. Samuel Beal, in The Indian Antiquary, translated the passage as follows:

Forty stages or so to the eastward of this (Ādityasena's temple]]) we come to the Nalanda temple. First taking the Ganges and descending it, we reach the Mṛgaśikhāvana temple. Not far from this is an old temple, the foundations of which alone remain - it is called China temple.

However, in his introduction of The Life of Hiuen Tsiang, Beal translated the same passage as follows:

About forty stages of east of this [Adityasena's temple] following the course of the Ganges is the Deer Temple [Mṛgaśikhāvana], and not far from this is a ruined establishment with only its foundation remaining, called the China Temple.

Historian R. C. Majumdar's English translation of the Édouard Chavannes's French translation of the passage is as follows:

More than forty yojanas to the east of the Nalanda temple, going down the Ganga, one arrives at the temple Mi-li-kia-si-kia-po-no (Mṛgaśikhāvana). Not far from this was an ancient temple of which only the brick foundations remain. It is called the temple of China.

Chavannes's translation is also corroborated by the Taisho edition of the text, and thus, Beal's interpretation seems to be incorrect.

=== Modern identification ===
Several historians have identified the location of Mṛgaśikhāvana in present-day Bengal region, situated to the east of Nalanda. D. C. Ganguly located Mi-li-kia-si-kia-po-no in Murshidabad district of West Bengal state of India, by taking 1 yojana as 5.71 miles. S. Chattopadhyaya identified it as a place in Malda district of West Bengal. According to R. C. Majumdar, it was located in either Malda district or in the Rajshahi District of Bangladesh.

Majumdar interpreted "Mi-li-kia-si-kia-po-no" as the Chinese transcription of "Mṛgasthāpana" rather than "Mṛgaśikhāvana". According to a 1015 CE manuscript, Mṛgasthāpana was the name of a stupa located in the historical Varendra region, which is now a part of Bengal. Other scholars have disputed this interpretation, as "Mi-li-kia-si-kia-po-no" is closer to the word "Mṛgaśikhāvana".

Some scholars, such as B. P. Sinha identify Mṛgaśikhāvana with the deer park of Sarnath, theorizing that Hwui-lun erroneously mentioned its location as east of Nalanda.

== Significance ==
Modern historians generally believe Che-li-ki-to to be a Chinese transcription of "Śri Gupta". Gupta was the founder of the Gupta dynasty, an important imperial power of India between the 4th and the 6th centuries. The original homeland of the Gupta dynasty is uncertain, and much of the debate on this topic among modern historians hinges around the identification of Mṛgaśikhāvana's location.

The identification of Che-li-ki-to with the dynasty's founder is also a factor in determining the religious affiliation of the dynasty's early kings. Historian A. K. Narain (1983) noted that contemporary scholarship is unaware of Gupta's religious affiliation, due to the lack of surviving evidence. Narain suggested that because he constructed a temple for Chinese Buddhist pilgrims, he might have been a Buddhist himself, or a member of the Hindu sect of Vaishnavism who was tolerant of Buddhist activity in his kingdom. This latter scenario would have been comparable with the later Gupta monarchs, who were predominantly Vaishnavites, but under whose regimes heterodox religious movements such as Buddhism and Jainism were allowed to flourish.
