= Allahabad Pillar =

One of the Pillars of Ashoka

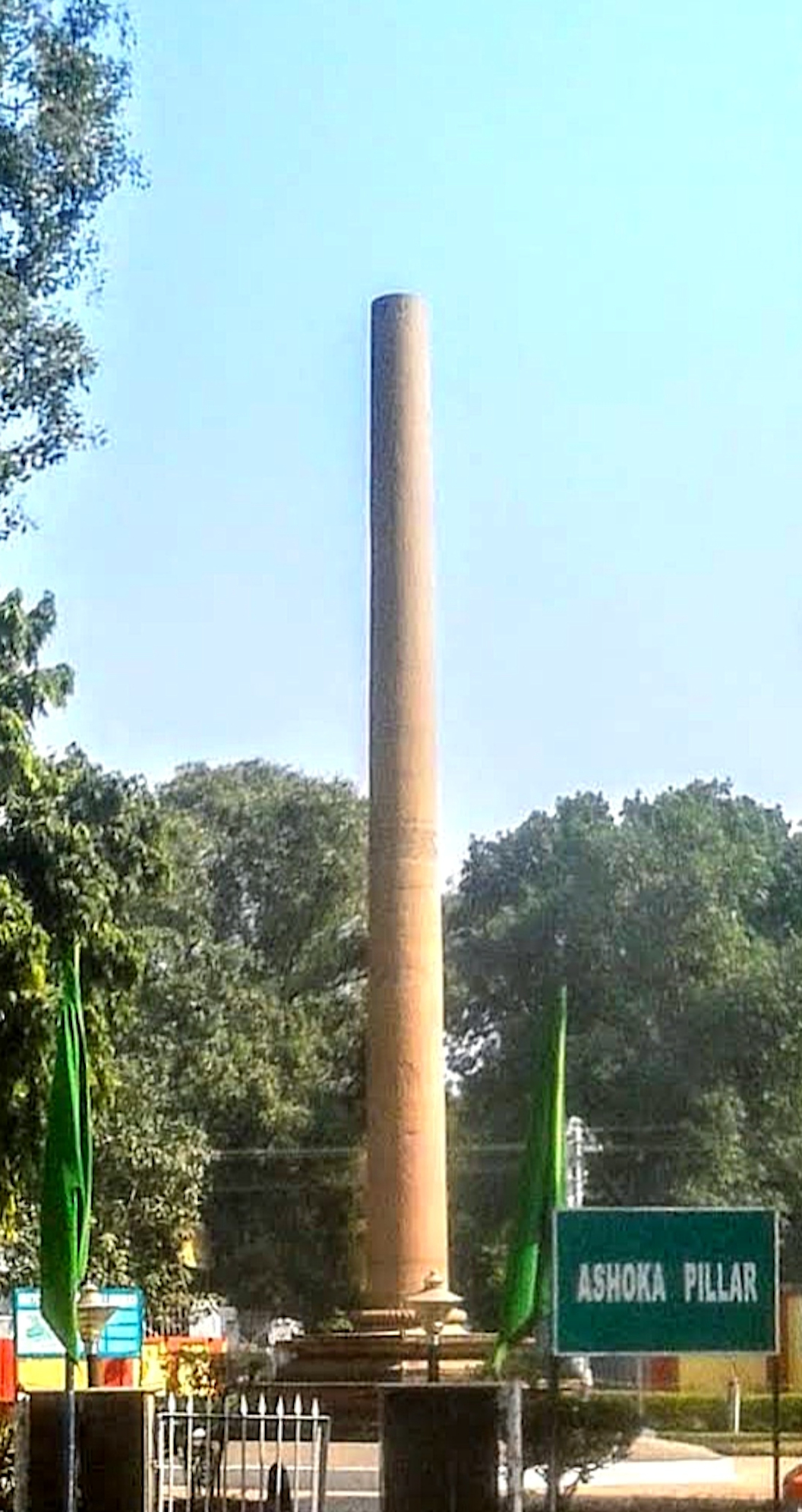
- The Allahabad Pillar.
- Interactive map of Allahabad Pillar
- Location: Prayagraj (Allahabad), Uttar Pradesh, India
- Coordinates: 25°25′52″N 81°52′30″E
- Type: Pillar
- Material: Sandstone
- Width: 35 inches (0.9 m)
- Height: 35 feet (10.7 m)
- Completion date: c. 3rd century BCE

The Allahabad Pillar is a stambha, containing one of the pillar edicts of Ashoka, erected by Ashoka, emperor of the Maurya dynasty, who reigned in the 3rd century BCE. While it is one of the few extant pillars that carry Ashokan edicts, it is particularly notable for containing later inscriptions attributed to the Gupta emperor Samudragupta (4th century CE). Also engraved on the stone are inscriptions by the Mughal emperor Jahangir, from the 17th century.

According to some scholars, the pillar was moved from its original location and installed within Akbar's Allahabad Fort in Prayagraj (formerly Allahabad), Uttar Pradesh by Emperor Akbar himself, but this theory is disputed by other scholars who point out the absence of any confirmatory evidence that the pillar was moved, and pre-Mughal inscriptions that indicate that it was already present in its current location. As the fort is now occupied by the Indian Army, the public are only allowed limited access to the premises and special permission is required to view the pillar.

== History ==
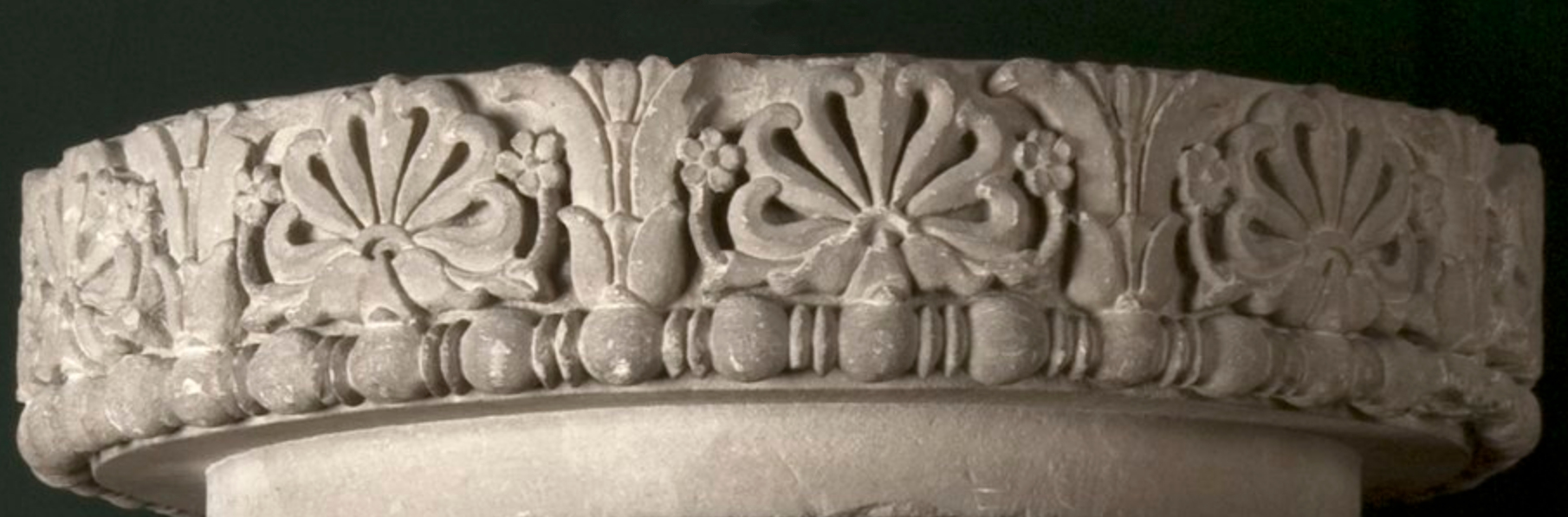
Frieze of the lost capital of the Allahabad Pillar, with lotuses framing a "flame palmette" surrounded by small rosette flowers.

The Allahabad Pillar is a single shaft of polished sandstone standing 35 feet (10.7 m) high. It has a lower diameter of 35 inches (0.9 m) and an upper diameter of 26 inches (0.7 m). The customary lotiform bell-shaped capital seen in the other Ashoka Pillars is lost, as is whichever statue mounted it. However the abacus, adorned by a "graceful scroll of alternate lotus and honeysuckle" that the statue must have rested upon, was found nearby. Cunningham believed that the capital must have been mounted by a single lion. The abacus is almost identical to the one found on the pillar at Sankasya suggesting proximate erection dates.

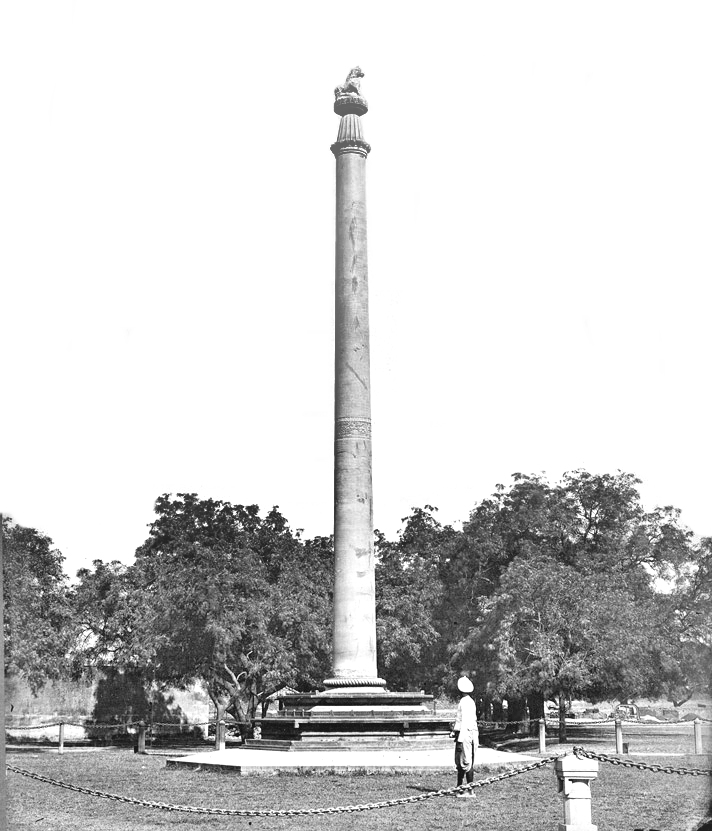
The ancient Ashoka Pillar at Allahabad topped with a colonial-era lion capital (photographed c. 1870). The lion capital was possibly designed by Captain Edward Smith in 1838.

=== Ashokan Pillar from Kaushambi ===
According to the theory proposed by 19th-century archaeologists, and supported by Indian scholars such as Upinder Singh, the Allahabad Pillar came from somewhere else, probably Kaushambi. The Ashokan inscriptions suggest that the pillar was first erected at Kaushambi, an ancient town some 30 miles (50 kilometres) west of its current location which was then the capital of the kingdom of Vatsa. It was moved to Allahabad much later when the region came under Muslim rule. The presence of another broken pillar at Kaushambi near the ruins of the Ghoshitarama monastery has led some to believe that the Allahabad Pillar might have been one of a pair, not unlike the ones discovered at Rampurva.

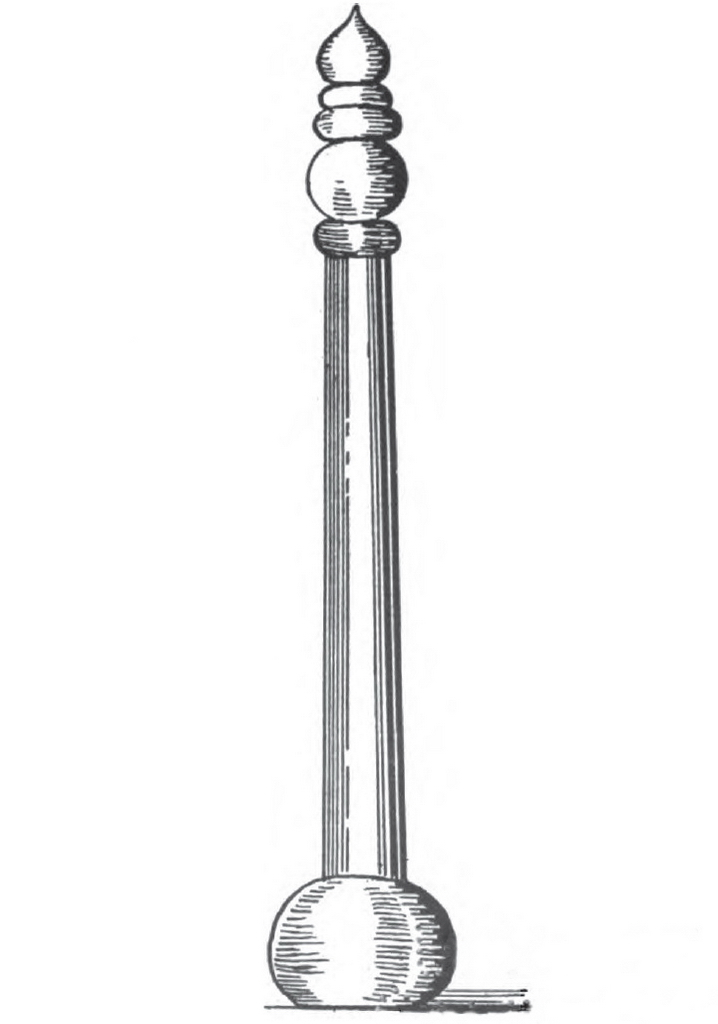
The Allahabad Pillar as seen by the missionary Joseph Tiefenthaler in the 18th century

The pillar has been taken down and re-erected a number of times since the 13th century. It was once re-erected during the time of Jahangir in 1605, albeit crowned by a globe surmounted by a cone, and was later sketched by the Jesuit missionary, Joseph Tiefenthaler, in the mid-18th century. General Kyd pulled the pillar down in 1798. In 1838, Captain Edward Smith "of the Engineers" set up the pillar once again, this time with a new lion capital of his own design. Cunningham criticised this effort at restoration as "a signal failure" as he thought the statue was "small and recumbent". He summed up the design with the following remark,

Indeed, it looks to me not unlike a stuffed poodle stuck on the top of an inverted flower pot.

=== Ashokan Pillar, in situ ===
An alternate theory proposed by Krishnaswamy and Ghosh in 1935 states that the Allahabad Pillar was never moved. They dismissed the theory that Muslim Sultans, anyone from the Mughal empire, Hindu kings before the arrival of Islam, or any private individual may have moved the pillar from Kaushambi to the current location. Their arguments are based on the dates of the numerous inscriptions on the pillar, the lack of textual evidence in any historical texts, or of a reason for anyone to move the pillar from Kaushambi to Allahabad, since there is no evidence that these were significant cities. They also dismiss the possibility that a private individual may have moved it because the pillar is too big and heavy, and required a very large amount of resources to move it. Ashoka may have installed it at Prayag because the confluence of Ganges and Yamuna rivers was already a major pilgrimage site during his time, thus a location that gave more access and visibility to his edicts. The Ashokan inscription is merely a copy of the Kausambi inscription, state Krishnaswamy and Ghosh. The surface damage and the addition of numerous new inscriptions happened while the pillar stood in Allahabad.

=== Pre-Ashokan, Prayāga bull-pillar ===
A third theory was proposed in 1979 by John Irwin, who concurred with Krishnaswamy and Ghosh that the Allahabad Pillar was never moved and was always at the confluence of the rivers Ganges and Yamuna. He further stated that the pillar's origins were undoubtedly pre-Ashokan based on all the evidence at the site, the major and minor inscriptions as well as textual evidence, taken together. According to Irwin, an analysis of the minor inscriptions and ancient scribblings on the pillar first observed by Cunningham, also noted by Krishnaswamy and Ghosh, reveals that these included years and months, and the latter "always turns out to be Magha, which also gives it name to the Magh Mela", the bathing pilgrimage festival of the Hindus.

Archaeological and geological surveys done since the 1950s, states Irwin, have revealed that the rivers – particularly Ganges – have a different course now than in distant past. The original path of river Ganges had settlements dating from 8th-century BCE onwards. This ancient path of the river placed the pillar more directly on the banks of the confluence. Further, east from the pillar is the remains of an ancient massive well (samudra-kup in early Sanskrit texts), in the direction of the remains of Pratisthan (now Jhusi). The Vasuki temple and Alarkapuri, which pilgrims visit after ritual bathing as a part of their traditional parikrama (circumambulation, Magha Mela walking circuit), are also ancient and consistent with early Sanskrit texts. According to Irwin, the pillar itself is pre-Buddhist, to which Ashoka added the Brahmi script inscription to advertise his edicts to the masses of pilgrims and the extant Buddhist monasteries there. He adds, "we also know with certainty that its original emblem had been – not a lion, as previously supposed – but the bull of pre-Buddhist, Brahmanical religion".

According to Karel Werner – an Indologist known for his studies on religion particularly Buddhism, Irwin work "showed conclusively that the pillar did not originate at Kaushambi", but had been at Prayaga from pre-Buddhist time as a centre of a very ancient pillar cult and that in fact, this was incorrectly attributed to Ashoka.

== Inscriptions ==
When James Prinsep of the Asiatic Society came across the broken pillar just inside the gates of the Allahabad Fort in c. 1834, its inscriptions were being eroded by the rain and sun. He remarked,

I could not see the highly curious column lying at Allahabad, falling to rapid decay, without wishing to preserve a complete copy of its several inscriptions …

There are three sets of inscriptions on the column from the three emperors, Ashoka Maurya, Samudragupta and Jahangir. They are accompanied by some minor inscriptions by pilgrims and others, which were derided as a mass of modern scribblings by Alexander Cunningham. Some of these are, however, dated and coupled with the style of scripts used, are useful to establish the periods when the pillar was in an erect position, and when it was lying prone on the ground.

=== Ashoka inscriptions ===
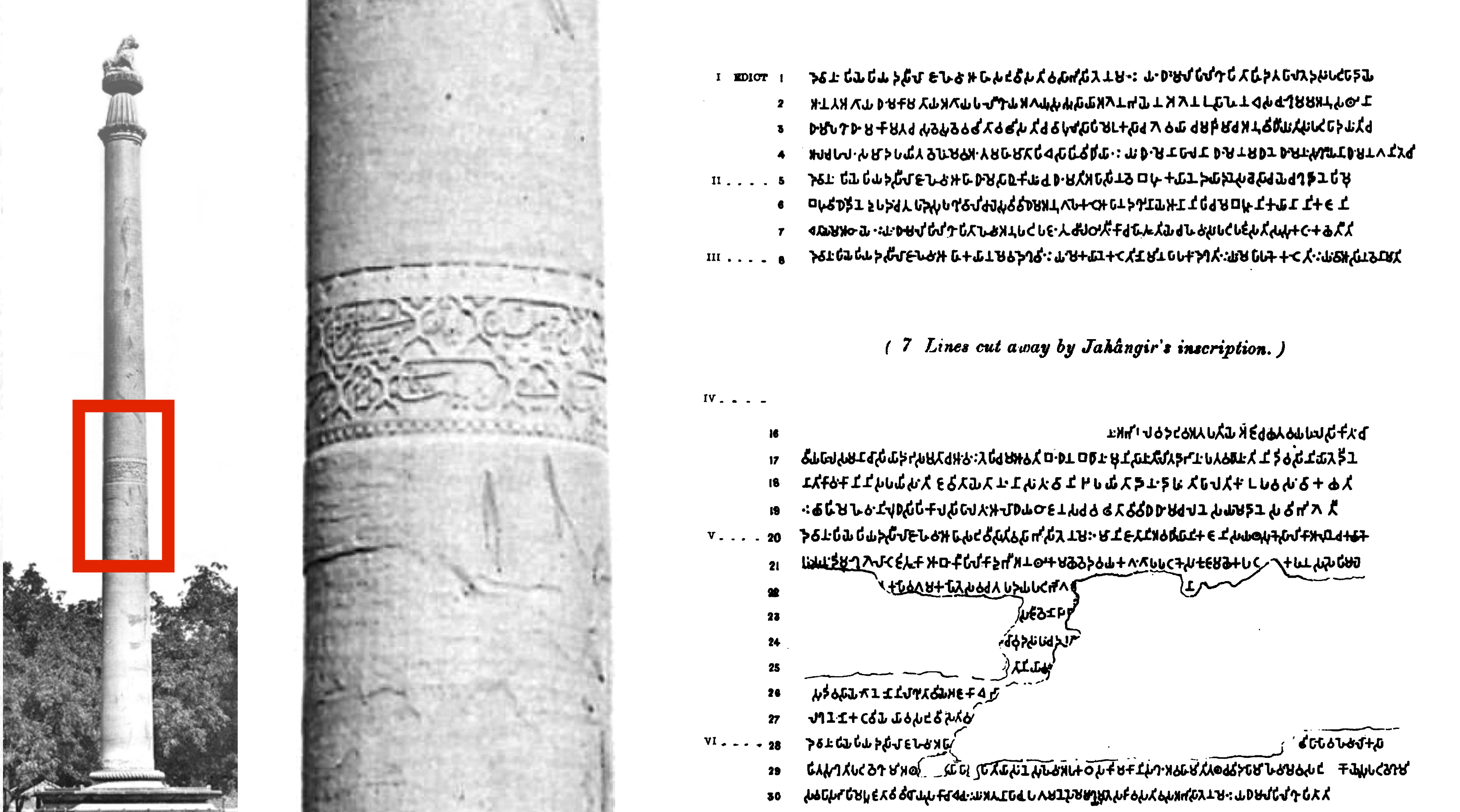
Major Pillar Edicts 1-6 on the Allahabad Pillar of Ashoka

The Ashokan inscriptions on the Allahabad Pillar (along with inscriptions elsewhere) were pivotal to the decipherment of the Brahmi script by The Asiatic Society's James Prinsep. It led to the rediscovery of the Mauryan emperor and the unearthing of the full extent of his empire.

The inscription is engraved in continuous lines around the column in Brahmi and contains the same six edicts that can be seen on the other pillars. The surviving inscriptions from the Ashoka period are "uniform in size, neat and deeply engraved" observed Cunningham.

==== Major Pillar Edicts 1-6 ====
The pillar contains the Major Pillar Edicts of Ashoka, from 1 to 6. The first and second edicts have survived in full. However, much of the third and fourth edicts were "ruthlessly destroyed by the cutting of the vain-glorious inscription of Jahangir, recording the names of his ancestors". Only two lines of the fifth edict have survived, the others lost by surface peel off. The sixth is almost complete, with a loss of about half a line. These edits are the same as found at other Ashokan pillars. Besides the six edicts, the Allahabad pillar also includes what are known as the Schism edict, the Queen's edict and the Birbal Magha Mela inscription.

==== Schism edict ====
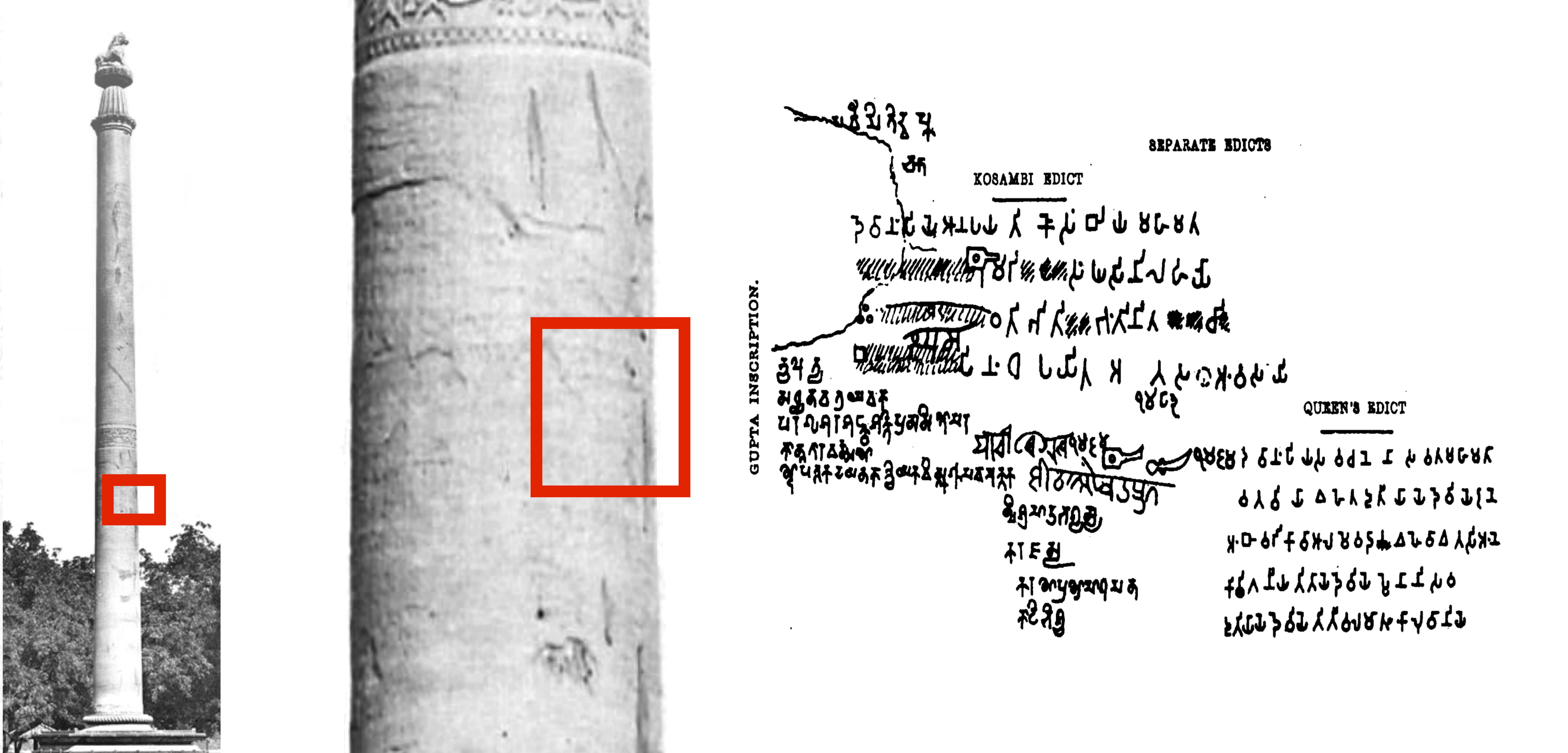
Schism and Queen Edict inscriptions on the Allahabad Pillar of Ashoka

The Schism Edict, referred to as the Kaushambi edict by Cunningham, is a command from the emperor addressing the senior officials (Mahamatras) of Kaushambi urging them to avoid dissension and stay united. The following is a conflation of various fragmented versions of the edict:

The Beloved of the Gods orders the officers of Kauśāmbī/Pāṭa(liputra) thus: No one is to cause dissention in the Order. The Order of monks and nuns has been united, and this unity should last for as long as my sons and great grandsons, and the moon and the sun. Whoever creates a schism in the Order, whether monk or nun, is to be dressed in white garments, and to be put in a place not inhabited by monks or nuns. For it is my wish that the Order should remain united and endure for long. This is to be made known to the Order of monks and the Order of nuns. Thus says the Beloved of the Gods: You must keep one copy of this document and place it in your meeting hall, and give one copy to the laity. The laymen must come on every Uposatha day [day of confession and penance] to endorse this order. The same applies to special officers who must also regularly attend the Uposatha, and endorse this order, and make it known. Throughout your district you must circulate it exactly according to this text. You must also have this precise text circulated in all the fortress districts [under military control].

==== Queen's edict ====
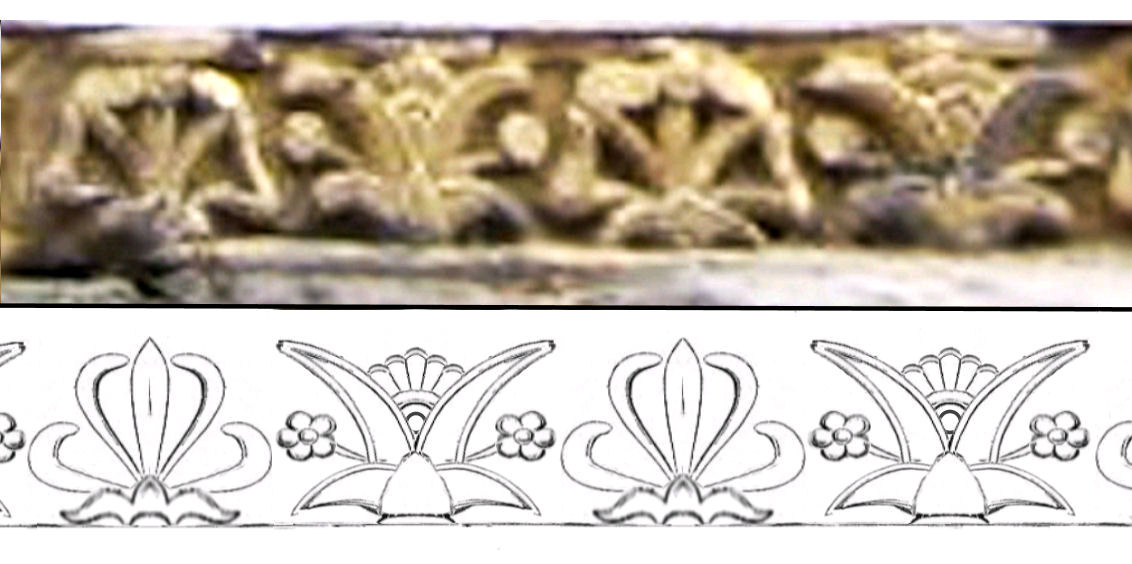
Similar decorative friezes can be seen at the Diamond throne of Bodh Gaya, also built by Ashoka.

The Queen's Edict refers to the charitable deeds of Ashoka's second queen, Karuvaki, the mother of Prince Tivala.

On the order of the Beloved of the Gods, the officers everywhere are to be instructed that whatever may be the gift of the second queen, whether a mango-grove, a monastery, an institution for dispensing charity or any other donation, it is to be counted to the credit of that queen … the second queen, the mother of Tīvala, Kāruvākī.

=== Samudragupta inscription ===
A later inscription, also known as the Prayag Prashasti, is attributed to the 4th century CE Gupta Emperor Samudragupta, and follows immediately below the edicts of Ashoka. It is considered "the most important historical document of the classical Gupta age". It is in Sanskrit, written in the Gupta script (a later version of Brahmi) by the poet and minister, Harishena. The inscription is a panegyric praising Samudragupta and lists the political and military achievements of his reign including his expeditions to the south. It provides a unique snapshot of the Gupta Empire and its neighbours and is the source of much of what is known of the geopolitical landscape of that era.

The following is from the translation of the inscription by D. R. Bhandarkar:

Samudragupta inscription

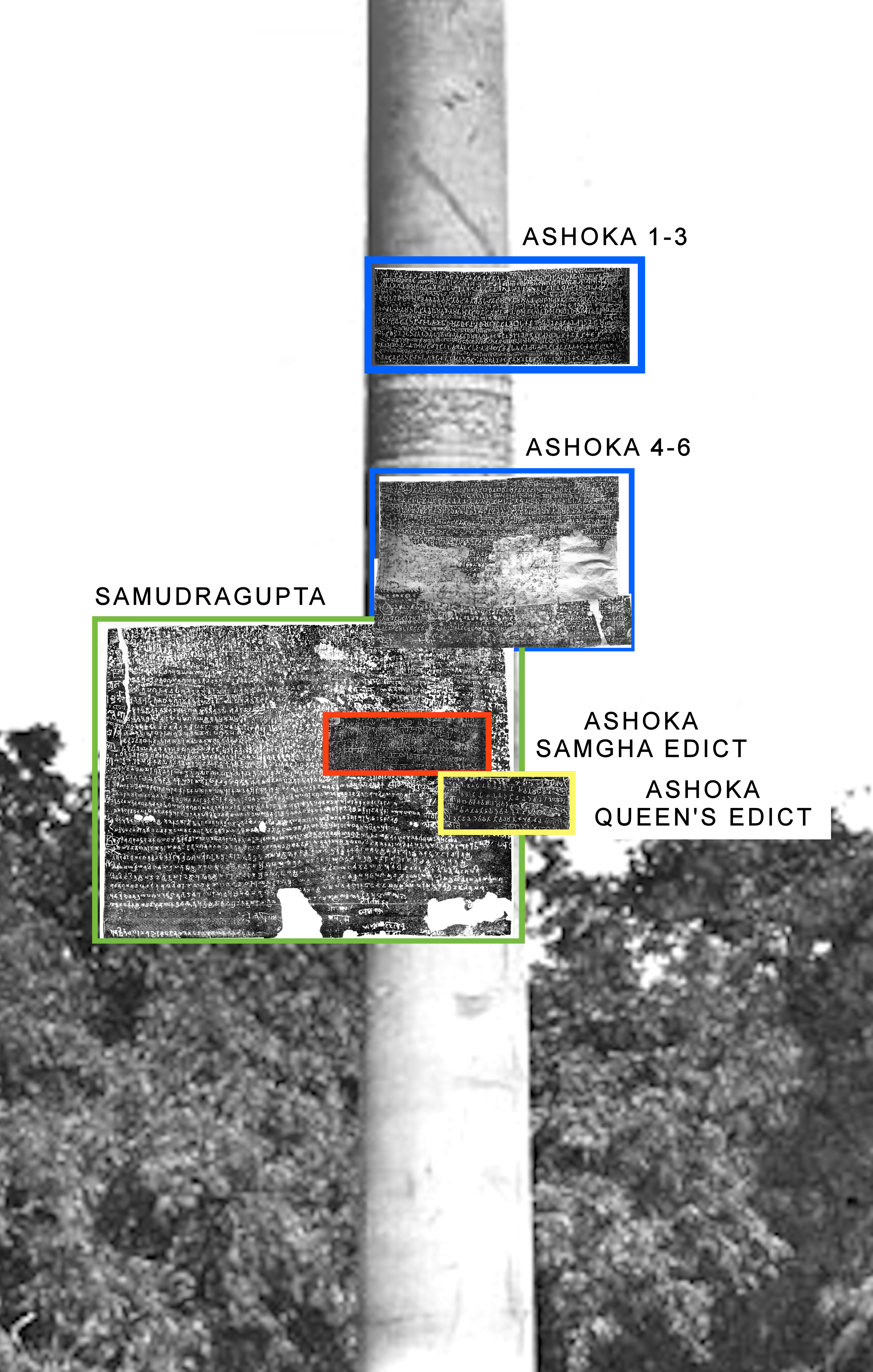
The Samudragupta inscription relative to the Edicts of Ashoka.

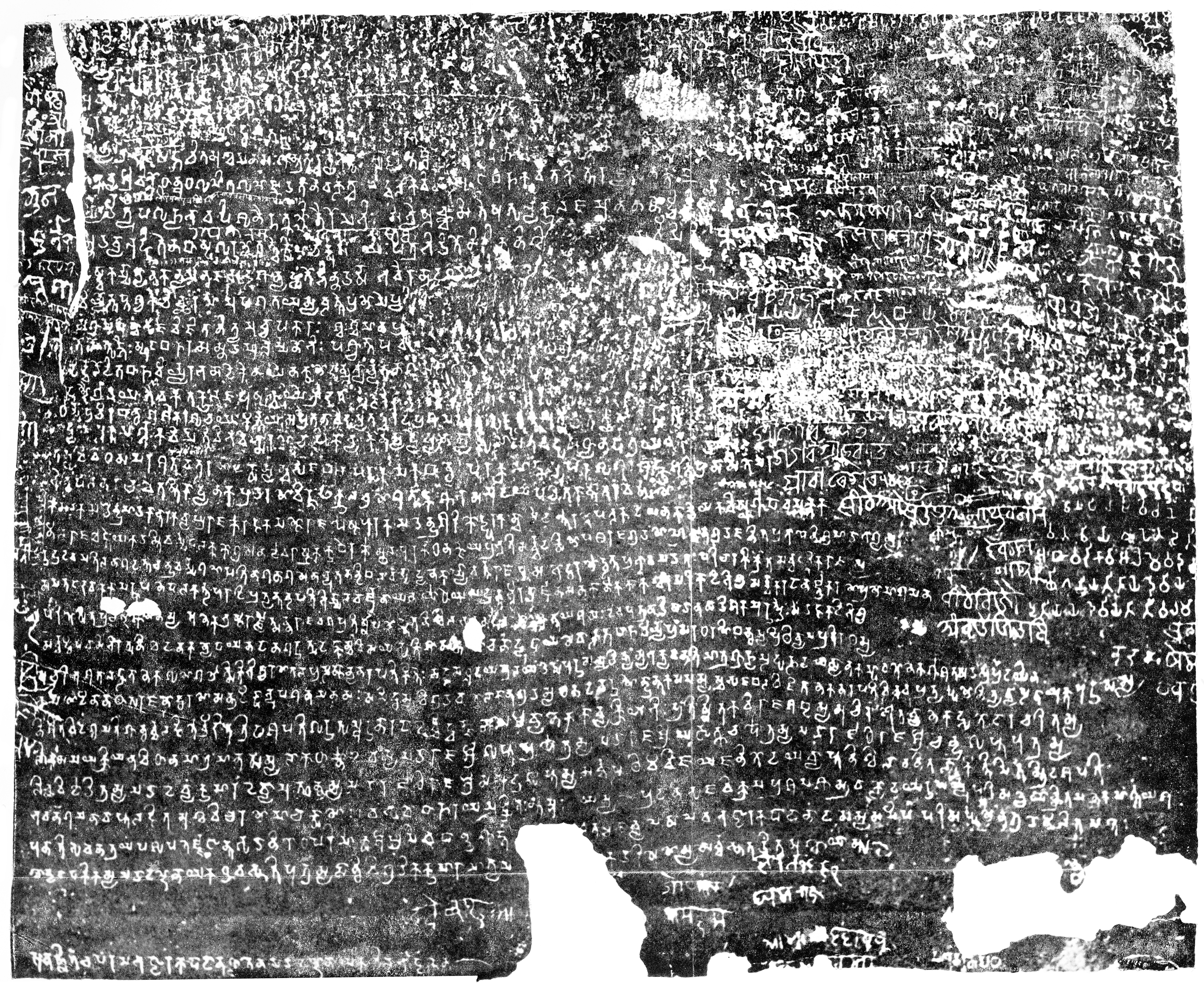
Allahabad pillar inscription of Samudragupta. It almost completely circles the pillar, and is written around the Minor Edicts of Ashoka.

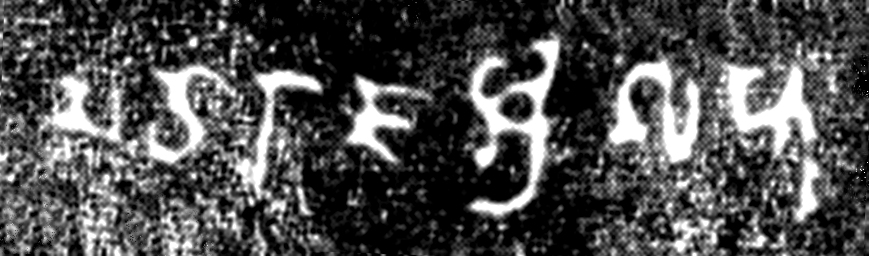
Gupta script inscription "Maharaja Sri Gupta" ( Great King, Lord Gupta"), mentioning the first ruler of the dynasty king Gupta. Inscription by Samudragupta on the Allahabad pillar, where Samudragupta presents king Gupta as his great-grandfather. Dated circa 350 CE.

- (Verse 3) Whose mind is surcharged with happiness in consequence of his association with the wise, who is thus accustomed to retain the truth and purpose of (any) science . . . . . . fixed . . . . . . upraised . . . . . . who, removing impediments to the grace of good poetry through the very injunction (ājñā) of (poetic) excellence (guṇa) clustered together (guṇita) by the experts, enjoys, in the literate world, in an attractive fashion, sovereignty, in consequence of fame for copious lucid poetry.
- (Verse 4) (Exclaiming) "Come, oh worthy (one)", and embracing (him) with hair standing on end and indicating (his) feeling, (his) father, perceiving (him) with the eye, overcome with affection, (and) laden with tears (of joy), (but) discerning the true state (of things) said to him "so protect (thou) the whole earth", while he was being looked up with sad faces by others of equal birth, (but) while the courtiers were breathing cheerfully.
- (Verse 5) Beholding whose many super-human actions, some felt the thrill of marvel and burst into horripilation, some relishing with feeling . . . . . ., some afflicted with his prowess sought (whose) protection after performing obeisance;. . . . . .
- (Verse 6) (Whose enemies), whose offence was always great, being conquered by his arm in battles . . . . . . day by day . . . . . . pride . . . . . . (develop) repentance with their minds filled with delight and expanding with much and evident pleasure and affection.
- (Verse 7) By whom, with the impetuosity of the prowess of (his) arm, which grew to overflowing, having singly and in a moment uprooted Achyuta and Nāgāsēna and Gaṇapati come together in a battle (against him) thereafter, causing, indeed, the scion of the Kōta family to be captured by (his) forces, (while) amusing himself at (the city) named Pushpa, while the sun . . . . . . the banks . . . . . .
- (Verse 8) (Being) the enclosing structure of Dharma (Sacred Law), (his) multifarious sprouting fame is as bright as the rays of the moon; (his) erudition pierces down to Truth . . . . . . quiescence . . . . . ., the course of (his) wise utterances is worthy of study; (his) again is poetry which outdistances the greatness of the genius of (other) poets. What excellence is there which does not belong to him ? So has he alone become a fit subject of contemplation with the learned.?
- (Lines 17–18) Of him (who) was skilful in engaging in hundreds of battles of various kinds, whose only ally was valour (parākrama) through the might of his own arm, and who (has thus) the epithet Parākrama, whose body was most charming, being covered over with the plenteous beauty of the marks of hundreds of promiscuous scars, caused by battle-axes, arrows, spikes (śaṅku), spears (śakti), barbed darts (prāsa), swords, iron clubs (tōmara), javelins for throwing (bhindipāla), barbed arrows (nārācha), span-long arrows (vaitastika) and many other weapons.
- (Lines 19–20) Whose magnanimity blended with valour was caused by (his) first capturing, and thereafter showing the favour of releasing, all the kings of Dakshiṇāpatha such as Mahēndra of Kōsala, Vyāghrarāja of Mahākāntāra, Maṇṭarāja of Kurāḷa, Mahēndragiri of Pishṭapura, Svāmidatta of Kōṭṭūra, Damana of Ēraṇḍapalla, Vishṇugōpa of Kāñchī, Nīlarāja of Avamukta, Hastivarman of Vēṅgī, Ugrasēna of Pālakka, Kubēra of Dēvarāshṭra, and Dhanañjaya of Kusthalapura.
- (Line 21) (Who) is great through the extraordinary valour, namely, the forcible extermination of many kings of Āryāvarta such as Rudradēva, Matila, Nāgadatta, Chandravarman, Gaṇapatināga, Nāgasēna, Āchyuta-Nandin and Balavarman; who has made all the kings of the forest regions to become his servants.
- (Lines 22–23) (Whose) formidable rule was propitiated with the payment of all tributes, execution of orders and visits (to his court) for obeisance by such frontier rulers as those of Samataṭa, Ḍavāka, Kāmarūpa, Nēpāla, and Kartṛipura, and, by the Mālavas, Ārjunāyanas, Yaudhēyas, Mādrakas, Ābhīras, Prārjunas, Sanakānīkas, Kākas, Kharaparikas and other (tribes)."
- (Line 23) (Whose) fame has tired itself with a journey over the whole world caused by the restoration of many fallen kingdoms and overthrown royal families.

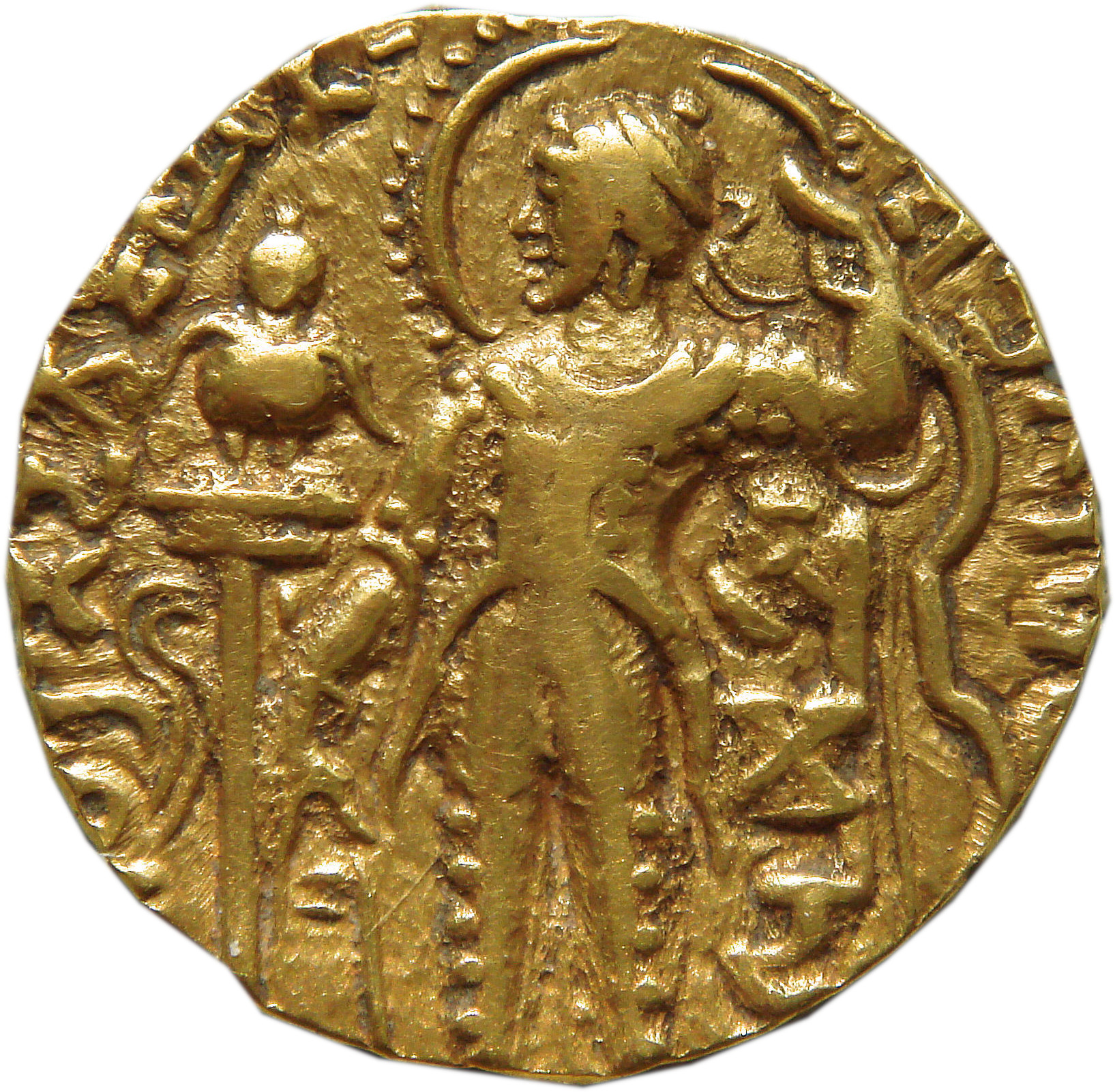
A Samudragupta coin featuring the Garuda banner.

- (Lines 23–24) The unimpeded flow (prasara) of the prowess of (whose) arm (was arrested) by an earth embankment (dharaṇi-bandha) put up by means of service through such measures as self-surrender, offering (their own) daughters in marriage and a request for the administration of their own districts and provinces through the Garuḍa badge, by the Dēvaputra-Shāhi-Shāhānushāhi and the Śaka lords and by (rulers) occupying all Island countries, such as Siṁhala and others.
- (Lines 24–26) He was without an antagonist on earth; he, by the overflowing of the multitude of (his) many good qualities adorned by hundreds of good actions, has wiped off the fame of other kings with the soles of (his) feet; (he is) Purusha (Supreme Being), being the cause of the prosperity of the good and the destruction of the bad (he is) incomprehensible; (he is) one whose tender heart can be captured only by devotion and humility; (he is) possessed of compassion; (he is) the giver of many hundred-thousands of cows; (his) mind has received ceremonial initiation for the uplift of the miserable, the poor, the forlorn and the suffering; (he is) resplendent and embodied kindness to mankind; (he is) equal to (the gods) Kubēra, Varuṇa, Indra and Yama; (his) Āyukta officers are always engaged upon restoring wealth (titles, territories, etc.) to the many kings conquered by the might of his arms.
- (Lines 27–28) (He) has put to shame Bṛihaspati by (his) sharp and polished intellect, as also Tumburu, Nārada and others by the graces of his musical performances; (his) title of "King of Poets" has been established through (his) many compositions in poetry which were a means of subsistence to the learned people; (his) many wonderful and noble deeds are fit to be praised for a very long time; (he is) a human being, only as far as he performs the rites and conventions of the world, (otherwise he is) God whose residence is (this) world.

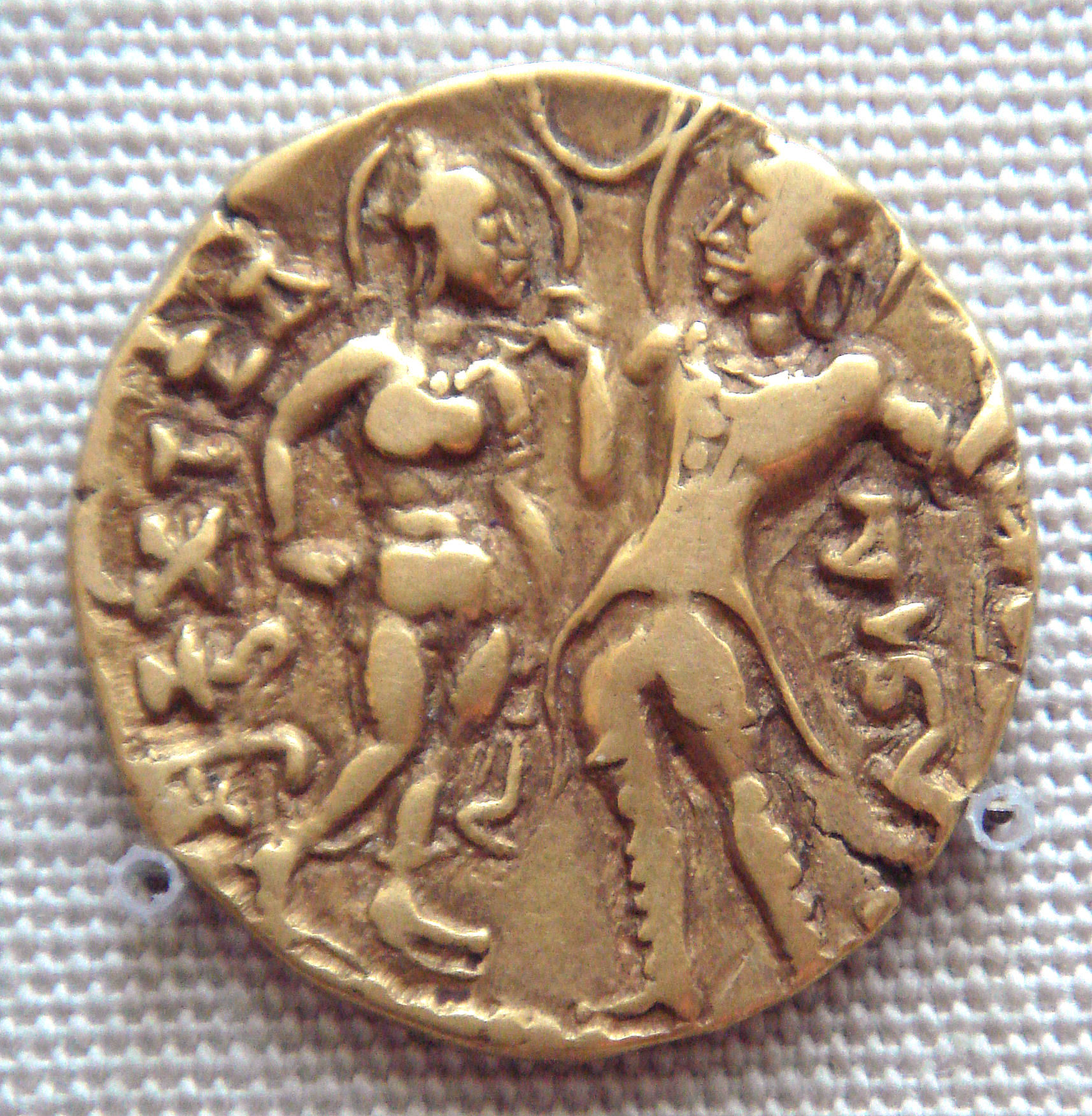
A coin of Chandragupta I, depicting Chandragupta and his Queen Kumaradevi, parents of Samudragupta described in the Allahabad inscription.

- (Lines 28–30) This lofty column, (is) the raised arm of the earth, proclaiming as it were, that the fame having pervaded the entire surface of the world with (its) rise caused by the conquest of the whole earth, has acquired an easy and graceful movement in that it has repaired from here (i.e. from this world) to the abode of (Indra) the lord of the gods—(the fame) of that prosperous Samudragupta the Mahārājādhirāja, son of the prosperous Chandragupta (I), the Mahārājādhirāja, born of the Mahādēvī Kumāradēvī, (and) daughter's son of the Lichchhavi, son's son of the prosperous Ghaṭōtkacha, the Mahārāja and the son of the son's son of the prosperous Gupta, the Mahārāja. Whose
- (Verse 9) fame, ever ascending higher and higher masses, and travelling by many paths, (namely) by liberality, prowess of arm, sobriety and utterance of scriptural texts, purifies the three worlds, like the white water of the (holy river) Gaṅgā, dashing forth rapidly when liberated from the confinement in the inner hollow of the matted hair of Paśupati, (which rises up in ever higher and higher masses and flows through many paths).
- (Lines 31–32) And may this poetic composition (kāvya) of Harishēṇa, the servant of the very same venerable Bhaṭṭāraka, whose mind has been enlightened through the favour of dwelling near (him), who is the Sāndhivigrahika, Kumārāmātya (and) Mahādaṇḍanāyaka, (and who is) a native of Khādyaṭapāka, and son of the Mahādaṇḍanāyaka Dhruvabhūti, lead to the welfare and happiness of all beings!
- (Lines 33) and (it) was executed by the Mahādaṇḍanāyaka Tilabhaṭṭaka who meditates on the feet of the Paramabhaṭṭāraka.

Earlier translations, including one by J. F. Fleet, also exist.

=== Birbal Magh Mela inscription ===
The Birbal Magh Mela inscription is from the second half of the 16th century.

In the Samvat year 1632, Saka 1493, in Magha, the 5th of the waning moon, on Monday, Gangadas's son Maharaja Birbal made the auspicious pilgrimage to Tirth Raj Prayag. Saphal scripsit.

This inscription is significant because it confirms that Prayag was a significant pilgrimage centre – Tirth Raj – for the Hindus in the 16th century, and that the festival was held in the month of Magha. The Samvat year 1632 is equivalent to 1575 CE, while Saka 1493 equals 1571 CE. One of these is a scribal error, but the decade is accurate because Allahabad was under Akbar's control at the time and where built a major fort. Historical documents also confirm that Birbal did visit Akbar and Allahabad often.

Cunningham noted that many smaller inscriptions were added on the pillar over time. Quite many of these inscriptions include a date between 1319 CE and 1397 CE, and most of these include the month Magha. According to Krishnaswamy and Ghosh, these dates are likely related to the Magh Mela pilgrimage at Prayag, as recommended in the ancient Hindu texts.

=== Jahangir inscription ===
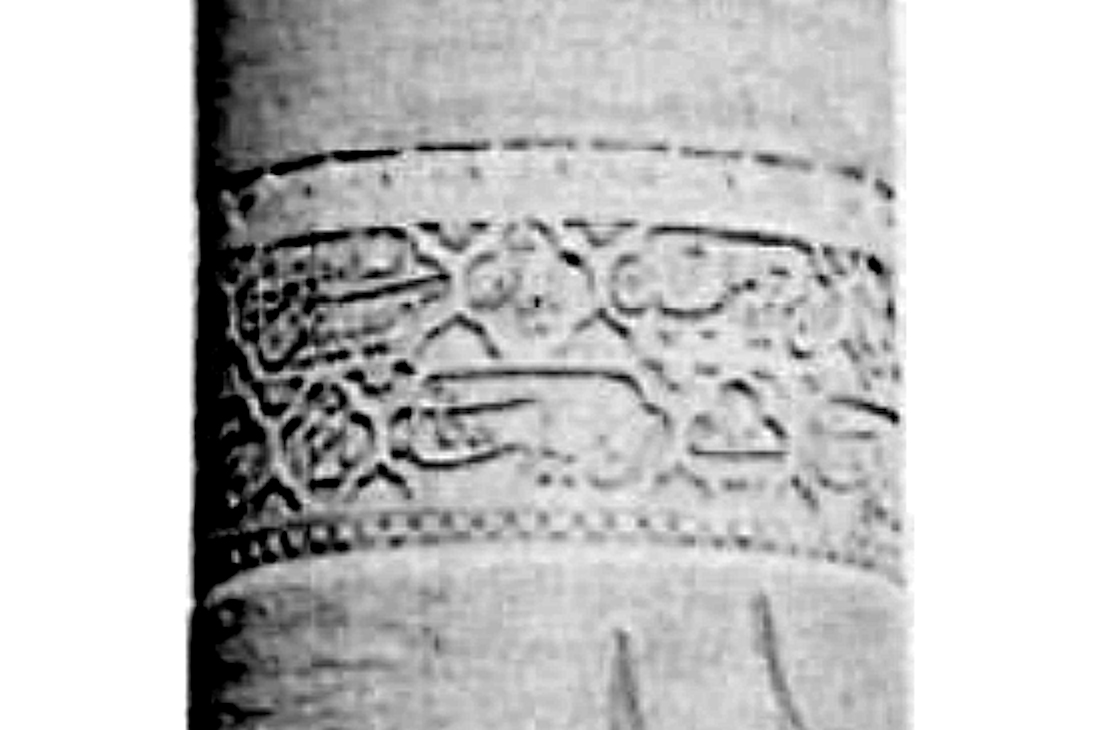
Jahangir inscription on the Allahabad Pillar of Ashoka.

A still later inscription in Persian traces the ancestry of the Mughal Emperor Jahangir. It was carved by Mir Abdullah Mushkin Qalam, shortly before his accession to the throne when he was still Shah Salim. The Jahangir inscription overwrote and "ruthlessly destroyed" the significant portion of the ancient Ashoka inscription, states Cunningham.

== See also ==
- Early Indian epigraphy
- Prashasti
- Gadhwa Stone Inscriptions (also in Prayagraj)
- Kahaum pillar
