= Bindeshwari Prasad Sinha =

Indian archeologist and historian from Bihar

Bindeshwari Prasad Sinha (1919–2002) was an Indian archaeologist and historian specialising in ancient Indian history. Sinha was a professor and head of the Department of History and Archaeology at Patna University. He was the founder of Bihar state's Directorate of Archaeology and Museums. He was also the director of the K. P. Jayaswal Research Institute in Patna.

== Biography ==
B. P. Sinha was born in Bihar Sharif in 1919. He obtained an M.A. degree from the Patna University. He obtained a Ph.D. from SOAS, University of London in 1948. His guide was Lionel Barnett, and his thesis was on the topic Decline of the Kingdom of Magadh. After returning to India, he taught at the Patna College, and later Patna University. He became the university's Head of department in 1958, and a professor in 1959. He also taught as a visiting professor in Bulgaria, the United States and Yugoslavia.

Sinha is known for having carried out the first excavations at Vikramashila, the site of an ancient Buddhist monastery established in the 8th century CE. He also carried out excavations at Chirand.

Sinha was among other scholars and academicians to support the Vishva Hindu Parishad (VHP, World Hindu Council) in their negotiations with the Babri Masjid Action Committee during the Ayodhya dispute. He authored a document that presented archaeological evidence in support of Ayodhya as Ram Janmabhoomi (or Lord Rama's birthplace), which the VHP later presented to the Government of India in December 1990.

Sinha died on 3 May 2002.

== Works ==
- Potteries in Ancient India, (edited), University of Patna, 1969.
- Vaiśālī Excavations, 1958-1962, (with Sita Ram Roy), Directorate of Archaeology and Museums, 1969.
- Sonpur Excavations, 1956 and 1959-1962, (with Bhagwati Sharan Verma), Directorate of Archaeology and Museums, 1977.
- Dynastic History of Magadha, Cir. 450-1200 A.D., Abhinav Publications, 1977.
- Readings in history and culture, Sandeep Prakashan, 1978.
- Archaeology & Art of India, Sundeep Prakashan, 1979.
- Comprehensive History of Bihar (two volumes, with Syed Hasan Askari and Kalikinkar Datta), K. P. Jayaswal Research Institute, 1983.
