= Chandravarman =

4th-century king of Pushkarana

Chandra Barman

Pushkarana
- Reign: 4th century CE
- Predecessor: Simhavarmana
- Father: Simhavarmana

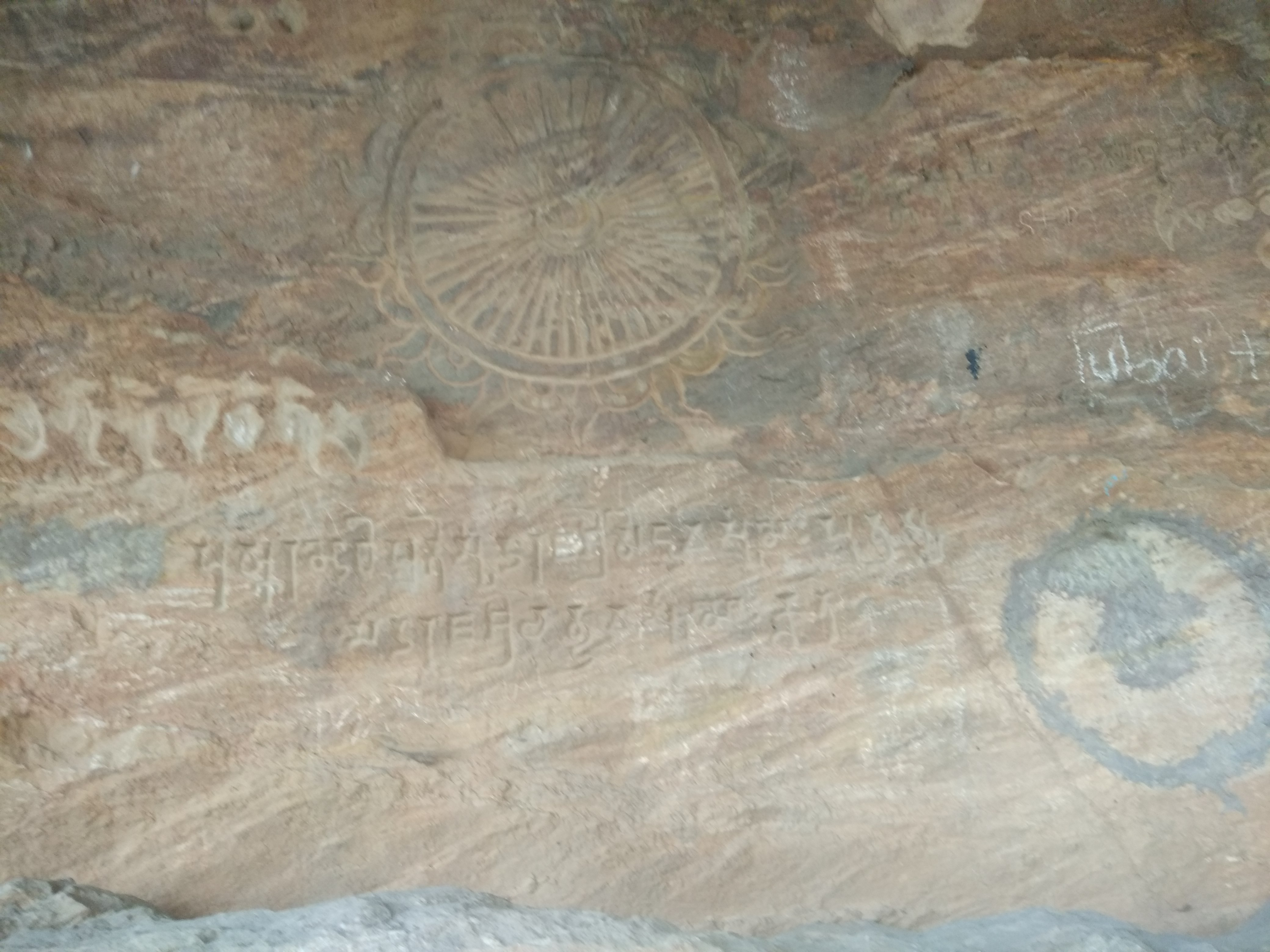
As Susunia Inscription of Chandravarman

Chandravarman (4th century CE) was a king of the Pushkarana kingdom in the Bankura district of West Bengal. The kingdom was established shortly before the advent of the Gupta Empire, and was located to the west of the Samatata kingdom of eastern Bengal.

Chandravarman was the son of king Simhavarmana. He extended his kingdom to the east towards the Faridpur district.

According to the inscription on the Allahabad pillar by Gupta emperor Samudragupta, Chandravarman was defeated by Samudragupta and the area became a part of the Gupta Empire:

"(L. 21.)- (Samudragupta,) who abounded in majesty that had been increased by violently exterminating Rudradeva, Matila, Nāgadatta, Chandravarman, Ganapatināga, Nāgasena, Achyutanandin, Balavarman, and many other kings of (the land of) Āryāvarta; -who made all the kings of the "forest countries" to become (his) servants."

— Allahabad pillar Samudragupta inscription

Alternatively, the Chandravarman named in the inscription could be a ruler named on an inscription found in Mandsaur in Malwa.

The defeat of Chandravarman paved the way to Gupta suzerainty over Bengal.

Chandra Barma, king of Malwa, invaded Mallabhoom in the fifth century A. D. [As Susunia Inscriptions (discovered by N. N. Basu) and H. P. Sastri's article (in the Antiquary) Show] Samudra Gupta conquest in the fourth century A. D.

== Sources ==
- Mallik, Abhaya Pada (1921). "History of Bishunpur-Raj: An Ancient Kingdom of West Bengal". INDIAN CULTURE. Calcutta, Bankura.
