= Mañjuśrī-mūla-kalpa =

Buddhist text

The Āryamañjuśrīmūlakalpa (The Noble Root Manual of the Rites of Mañjuśrī) is a Mahāyāna sūtra and a Mantrayāna ritual manual (kalpa) affiliated with the bodhisattva of wisdom, Mañjuśrī. In Tibetan Buddhism it is classified as a Kriyā-tantra. According to Sanderson (2009: 129) and the study by Matsunaga (1985), the text is datable to about 775 CE.

The Mañjuśrīmūlakalpa is often cited as the earliest example of an extant Indian Buddhist Tantra. Some scholars identify it as a compilation of a core verse text dated circa 6th century CE with later accretions and additions. The Sanskrit version, significantly longer than its corresponding Chinese and Tibetan renderings, is still extant.

The Mañjuśrīmūlakalpa states that mantras taught in the Shaiva, Garuda and Vaishnava tantras will be effective if applied by Buddhists since they were all taught originally by Mañjuśrī. The attribution to Mañjuśrī is an attempt by its author(s) to counter the objection that the teachings in this text are of non-Buddhist origin.

The bulk of the text deals with chants and mantras useful for spiritual purposes as well as material gain. Some chapters discuss fierce and sexual tantric rituals.

== Editions ==
The editio princeps of the mixed Sanskrit text was published by T. Ganapati Sastri in three volumes (Trivandrum, published 1920, 1923, and 1925 respectively).

Rahul Sankrityayana's edition appeared in 1934. Ganapati Sastri's edition with some modifications was reprinted by P. L. Vaidya in 1964.

An English translation was published online in 2020 by the 84000 organization.
