= Kumaradevi =

4th-century Gupta ruler

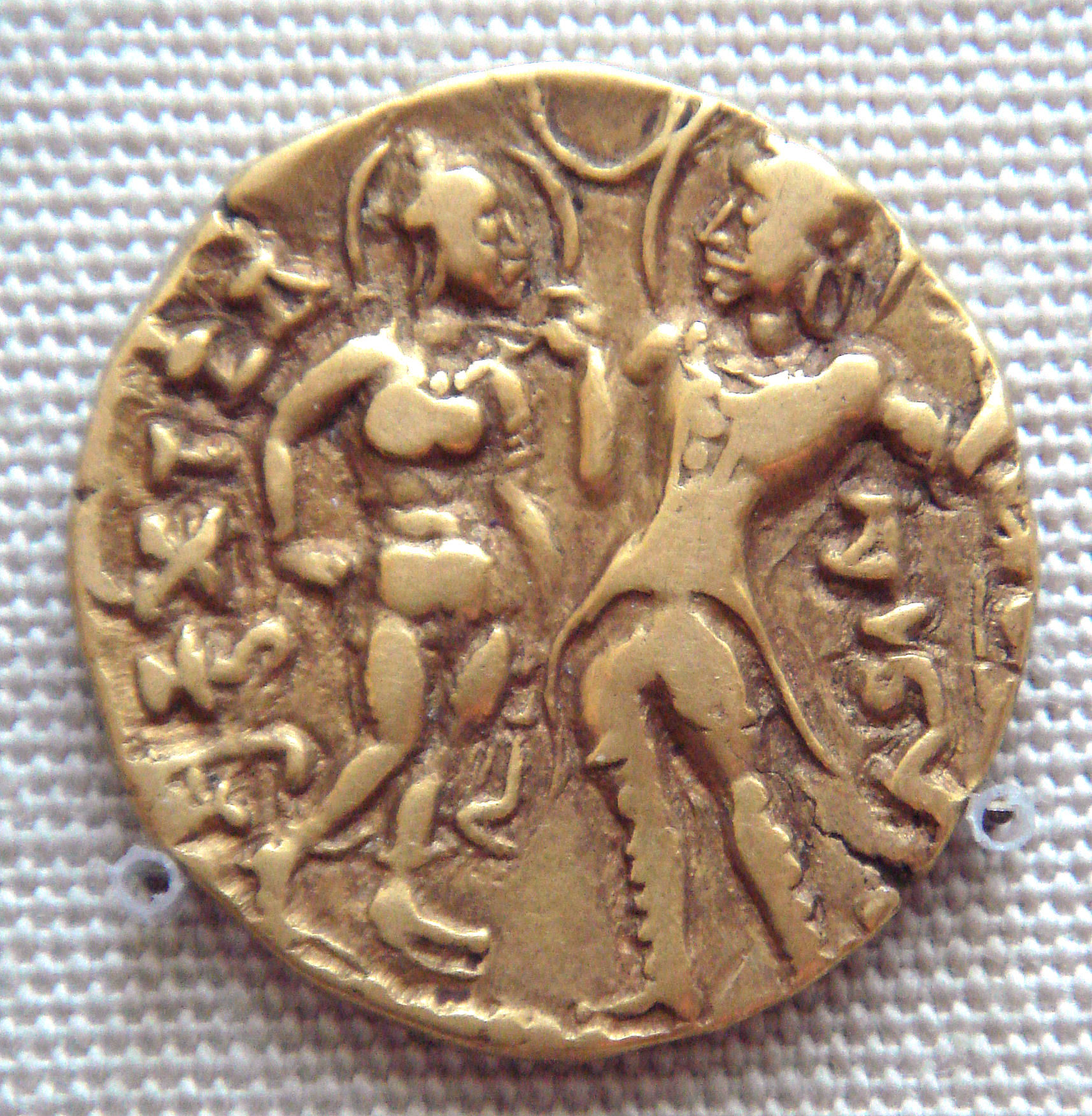
- A coin depicting Chandragupta I and Kumaradevi.

Gupta empress
- Reign: c. early 4th century
- Co-ruler: Chandragupta I
- Spouse: Chandragupta I
- Issue: Samudragupta
- Dynasty: Licchavi (by birth); Gupta (by marriage)
- Religion: Hinduism

Kumaradevi was the wife and co-ruler of the Gupta emperor Chandragupta I and the mother of the Gupta emperor Samudragupta.

She was a Licchavi princess and heiress, and the Licchavi territory was to merge into the Gupta kingdom after the marriage of her with Chandragupta I. She was recognised as a queen regnant in the new empire. Chandragupta I, throughout his reign, issued joint coinage, depicting him and Kumaradevi as joint rulers.
