= S. R. Goyal =

Indian historian

HOD of Jodhpur University
- In office 1970–1992

Personal details
- Born: 1932
- Died: 2015 (aged 83)
- Children: Shankar Goyal
- Education: Allahabad University
- Profession: Historian

Sri Ram Goyal (known as S. R. Goyal; 1932 – 2015) was an Indian historian and professor known for his work mainly on Gupta history.

== Career ==
S. R. Goyal pursued his academic career in ancient history, completing his Bachelor's degree in 1953 and his Master's degree in 1955 from Allahabad University, where he graduated with "first class first" honors. He began his teaching career at C.M.P. College, Allahabad (1955–58), and later moved to Gorakhpur University (1958–70). In 1970, he joined Jodhpur University (now Jai Narain Vyas University), where he has served as the Head of the Department of History.

== Works ==
Goyal has authored over 55 research papers and several books on ancient Indian history. Notable works include Viśva kī Prācīna Sabhyatāyeṃ (1963), Prācīna Bhārata kā Rājanaitika Itihāsa, Vol. III (1969), Prācīna Nepāla kā Rājanaitika aura Saṃskṛtika Itihāsa (1974), and Prācīna Bhāratīya Abhilekha Saṅgraha (1980). His doctoral thesis, A History of the Imperial Guptas (1967), has received recognition for its analysis of the Gupta period from scholars such as Professor A. L. Basham and Professor Eleanor Zelliot.

Goyal is also the Chief Editor of a 32-volume series on Indian History and Culture. This includes volumes like Māgadha Sāmrājya kā Udaya (1980) and Mughal Sāmrājya kā Prārambhika Itihāsa (1984). His research on the origins of the Brāhmī script during the Maurya period has been acknowledged in academic circles.

== Bibliography ==
=== Thesis ===
- Were the Imperial Guptas Brāhmanas by Caste? (in Hindi), Bulletin of the Gorakhapur University, 1961 pp. 5–9.
- Was Magadha the Original Home of the Imperial Guptas? PIHC, 1964 (abstract).
- Samudragupta and the North-West Proceedings of the Oriental Conference, Gauhati Session, 1964, pp. 153–68.
- The Problem of Bālādityas in the Gupta Period Bhuyan Commemoration Volume, Gauhati, 1965, pp. 100–4.
- Observations on the Sri Vikrama Coin of Samudragupta, JNSI, 1965, XXVII, Pt.ii, pp. 142–45.
- The Date of Kālidāsa, An Old Suggestion Modified POC, XXII, i,1965, p. 72f (abstract).
- The Date of Vasubandhu and the Identity of His Patron (in Hindi), Shri S.N.M. Tripathi Abhinandana Grantha, Varanasi, 1965, pp. 101–04.
- Attribution of Chandragupta-Kumāradevi Coin Type Indian Numismatic Chronicle. IV, Pt. ii, 1965–66, pp. 116–26.
- Attribution of the Coins of Prakāsàditya, JNSI, 1966, XXVIII, Pt. i, pp. 17–20.
- Early Chronology of the Gupta Dynasty, JBRS, III, Jan. 1966, pp. 55–67.
- Gayā and Nālandā Plates of Samudragupta, JBBS, III, Jan. 1966, pp. 68–72.
- Samudragupta: the King of the Meharauli Pillar Inscription (in Hindi), Nagari Pracharini Patrika, LXXIX, Pt.iii, V. E. 2021, pp. 261–77.

=== Books ===
==== Hindi ====
- Viśva kī prācīna sabhyatāem̐ (1963).
- Gupta evām sāmakalin rajavamsa (1969).
- Prācīna Nepāla kā rājanitika aura sāṃskr̥tika itihāsa (abhilekhoṃ ke ādhāra para) (1973).
- Māgadha sāmrājya kā udaya (1981).
- Prācīna Bhāratīya abhilekha saṅgraha : mūlapāṭha, anuvāda, tathā vyākhyā sahita (1982).
- Guptakālín Abhilekha (1984).
- Harsha Śīlāditya (1986).
- Bhārata meṃ Mug̲h̲ala sāmrājya kā prārambhika itihāsa : Akabara kī mr̥tyu taka (1987).
- Candragupta Maurya, eka navīna rājanītika-saṃskr̥tika adhyayana (1987).
- Samudragupta Parākramānka (1987).
- Gupta Sāmrājya kā itihāsa (1987).
- Magadha-Sātavāhana-Kushāṇa sāmrājyoṃ kā yuga (1988).
- Nanda-Maurya Sāmrājya kā itihāsa (1988).
- Gupta aura Vākāṭaka sāmrājyoṃ kā yuga (1988).
- Maukhari-Pushyabhūti-Cālukya yuga (1988).
- Dakshiṇa Bhārata kā itihāsa (1995).

==== English ====
- A History of the Imperial Guptas (1967).
- A religious history of ancient India, upto c. 1200 A.D. (1984).
- Kautilya and Megasthenes (1985).
- Harsha and Buddhism (1986).
- A History Of Indian Buddhism (1987).
- Inscriptions of Maukhari-Pushyabhuti-Chalukya age (1987).
- An introduction to Gupta numismatics (1994).
- The Coinage of Ancient India vol. I (1994).
- The Coinage of Ancient India vol. II (1995).
- Indian art of the Gupta age : from pre-classical roots to the emergence of medieval trends (2000).
- The Indica of Megasthenes : its contents and reliability (2000).
- The Kauṭilīya Arthaśāstra : its author, date, and relevance for the Maurya period (2000).
- India as known to Kauṭilya and Megasthenes (2001).
- Indian Buddhism after the Buddha (2003).
- Maulana Husain Ahmad Madni : a biographical study (2004).
- Buddhism in Indian history and culture : upto the Ambedkar movement (2004).
- Ancient Indian inscriptions : recent finds and new interpretations (2005).
- Brāhmī script : an invention of the early Maurya period (2006).
- A history of the Vākāṭaka-Gupta relations (2006).
- Śramaṇism in early Indian religions and religious life (2007).
- Pre-paurāṇika Hinduism : prehistoric genesis, contribution of the Indus religion, and vedic foundations of paurāṇika Hinduism (2008).
- Fundamentals of Paurāṇika Hinduism (2009).
- Birth and early growth of Indian society (2016).
- Paurāṇika sects and cults (2017).
- A comprehensive history of Hinduism (2018).
- Hinduism in the Context of Social History (Set of 3 Volumes) (2024) edition.

== See also ==
- Eleanor Zelliot
- D. N. Lorenzen
- A.L Basham
