= Campaigns of Samudragupta =

Military campaigns of the Magadha empire (355–375 CE)

- Possible extent of the Gupta Empire, near the end of Samudragupta's reign, c. 375 CE.
Date	c. 335–375 CE
Location	South Asia
Result	Gupta victory: Unification of the Ganga Valley
Territorial changes	Territories extending from Chenab River in the west to Brahmaputra River in the east and from the Foothills of Himalayas to Vindhyas falls to the Gupta Empire under direct rule. Territories till Kanchipuram annexed into Gupta Empire as Tributaries. Gupta borders extends from Assam in the east to Afghanistan in the west

Belligerents
Gupta Empire	Aryavarta Kingdoms Kingdoms: Kingdom of Achyuta; Kingdom of Nagasena; Kingdom of Kota; Kingdom of Rudradeva; Kingdom of Matila; Naga Kingdom; Pushkarana Kingdom; Magha dynasty; Forest Kingdoms Kingdoms: Parivrajaka dynasty; Dabhala Kingdom; Unknown 16 kingdoms; Frontier States States: Samatata; Davaka; Kumarupa; Nepala; Katripura; Tribal Oligarchies Tribal Kingdoms: Malavas; Arjunayanas; Yaudheya; Madra kingdom; Abhiras; Sanakanikas; Kakas; Prarjunas; Kharaparikas; Dakshinpatha Kingdoms Kingdoms: Kingdom of Kosala; Nalas; Mahakantara; Kurala; Pishtapura; Kottura; Erandapalla; Pallava dynasty; Avamukta; Vengi; Vashishta dynasty; Chieftains of Kusthalapura; Foreign Kingdoms Kingdoms: Later Kushanas; Sakas; Murundas; Simhala

Commanders and leaders
Samudragupta (WIA) (Note: According to Harisena, Samudragupta sustained wounds and scars from the 100 battles he fought.); Harisena	Achyuta Naga (surrendered) (executed); Nagasena (surrendered) (executed); Ganapati Naga (surrendered) (executed); Kota ruler (POW); Mahendra (POW); Vyagharaja (POW); Mantraja (POW); Mahendragiri (POW); Svamidatta (POW); Damana (POW); Vishnugopa (POW); Nilaraja (POW); Hastivarman (POW); Ugrasena (POW); Kubera (POW); Dhananjaya (POW); Rudradeva †; Matila †; Nagadatta †; Chandravarman †; Balavarman †

The Campaigns of Samudragupta were a series of military campaigns led by Gupta emperor Samudragupta in the mid to late 4th century CE throughout the various parts of the present-day South Asia. The campaigns resulted in the unification of the Ganges valley and the fall of several independent kingdoms, republics and tribes to the Gupta realm.

Samudragupta's Allahabad Prashasti records his campaigns in detail, said to have been written by Harisena. Samudragupta first launched his First Āryāvarta Campaign against the local rulers of the Ganga valley and completely uprooted them, the states of Achyuta, Ganapati Naga and Nagasena suffered the cause. The ruler of Kota dynasty was captured by the army of Samudragupta and was forced to accept the Gupta suzerainty.

Samudragupta after consolidating his power in the Ganga valley, moved to suppress the Southern Kings, who were captured, liberated and reinstalled back to their thrones. Samudragupta in the Dakshinpatha campaign, defeated 11 kings of South India, and annexed them into Gupta Empire as tributary states.

After finishing off with his Dakshinpatha campaign, Samudragupta launched his final campaign of Āryāvarta, where he defeated 9 kings and annexed them into Gupta Empire under direct administration. Thus,a 'war of extermination' against the Aryavarta kings was started by Samudragupta which was violent and bloody.

By the end of his reign, Samudragupta was able to gain control over almost whole of the Indian subcontinent, extending from modern day Punjab in the west to Assam in the east and from the foothills of Himalayas in the north to the Vindhyas in the south with the allegiance of Southern Kings along the eastern coast of India.

== Aims of Samudragupta's Campaigns ==
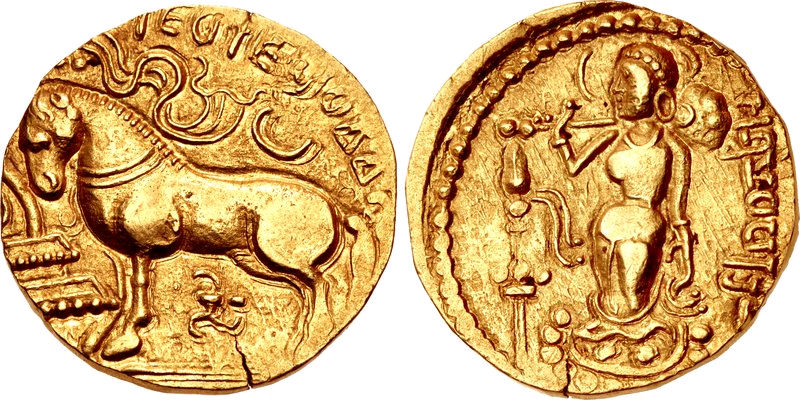
Ashvamedha type coin of Samudragupta

Various Scholars have interpreted the objectives and aims of Samuragupta's campaigns differently, many nationalist scholars relate it to religious ideas while more liberal scholars view it due to economic reasons.

=== Liberal views ===
Buddha Prakash states that, the Dakshinpatha campaign was led under economic considerations, as the demand of trade and commerce between India and Southeast Asia was rising, it became important for Samudragupta to secure few ports for the Empire.

=== Nationalist views ===
According to SR Goyel, Samudragupta was inspired by the Hindu ideals of Universal Ruler which was very popular during the Gupta age. According to BG Gokhale, the reason might have been religious. Samudragupta might have been influenced from the Nāgas performing the Vedic Ashvamedha Sacrifice, and he sought to perform it after his victory over Nagas.

Moreover, Tej Ram Sharma concludes that, Samudragupta was eager to conquer lands of Bharatvarsha and to be the 'Universal Monarch' after completing the Ashwamedha Sacrifice which is even evident from his coinage.

== First North Indian Campaign ==
=== Unification of Ganges Valley ===
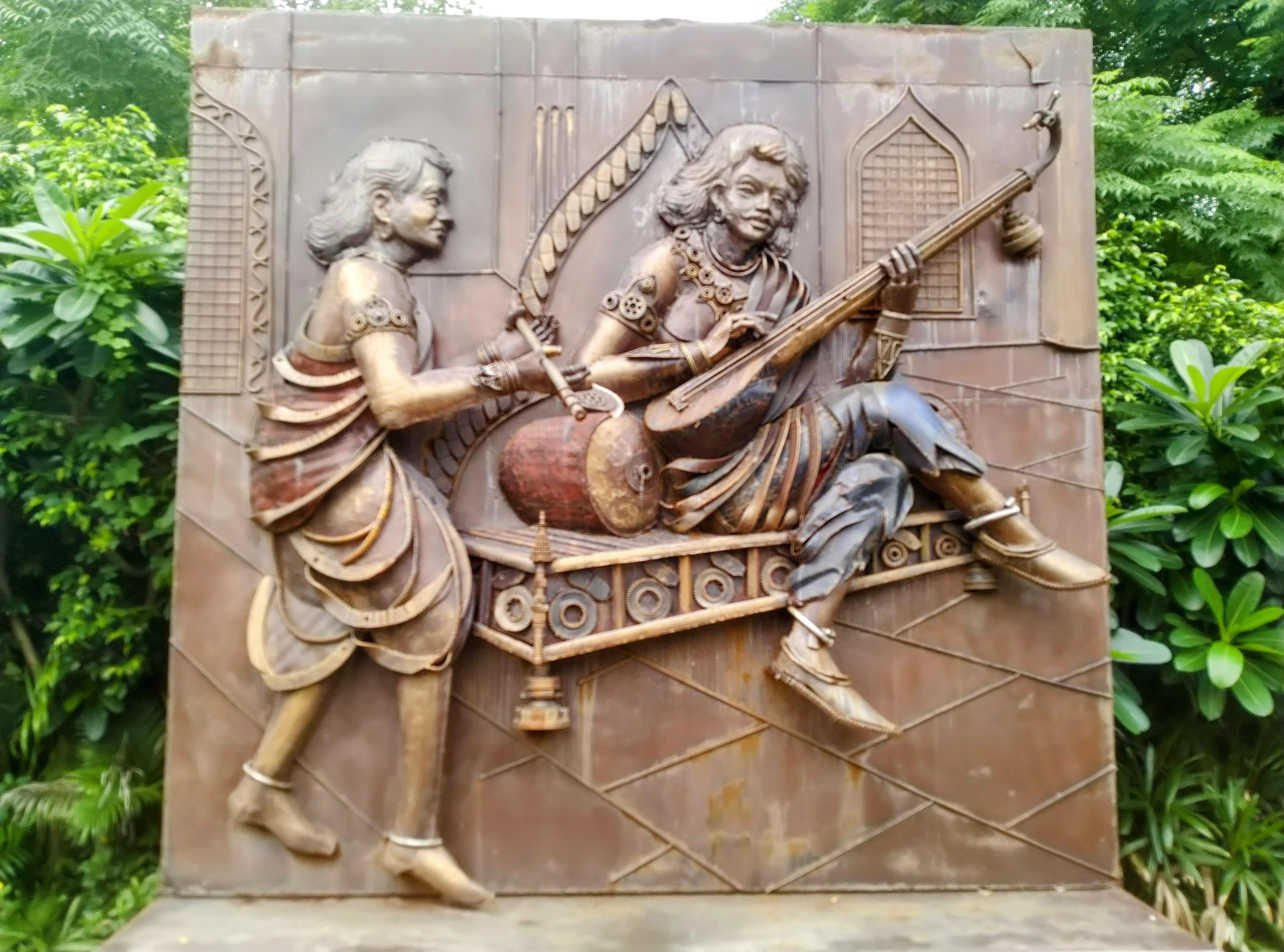
Sculpture of Samudragupta in Shaheedi Park, Delhi

The kingdom of Chandragupta I consisted of the parts of modern-day Bihar and Uttar Pradesh, despite this he adopted the title of Maharajadhiraja (Note: Sanskrit equivalent of "King of Kings"). He must have some sort of control over the Naga kings. By his death the Naga Kings, Achyuta, Ganapati Naga and Nagasena, broke off from the Gupta realm and established their own kingdoms. Achyuta is identified as the ruler of Ahichchatra (modern day Bareilly), Nagasena to be the ruler of Padmavati (Gwalior) and Ganapati Naga to be the ruler of Mathura. Samudragupta suppressed their revolts by the use of military scientists operated on the inner lines. The kings submitted to him seeking for Samudragupta's forgiveness.

Another ruler from the Kota dynasty tried to break off from the Gupta realm. The Kota ruler is identified as the ruler of Punjab region. The coins bearing the Legend kota and Shiva with his Bull has been found in various places such as Ludhiana, Sunet and Sanghol. Giving less importance to the revolt, Samudragupta divided the Imperial army and sent one of his general to defeat and punish the Kota ruler while he was campaigning against the Nāga rulers. The Kota ruler was then defeated and captured.

Thus, they were the first to fall in his conquests, which extended Gupta rule far beyond Prayaga and Saketa, reaching the areas around Mathura and Padmavati. It is also cleverly suggested that this battle against the rebellious princes took place at Kausambi, where Samudragupta used the Ashoka pillar as a symbol of his victory.

== South Indian Campaign ==
After establishing his power in the surrounding areas, Samudragupta launched his South Indian Campaign. The campaign had three features, namely capture of the enemy, liberating them, and reinstalling them back.

=== Route of the Campaign ===
Samudragupta's military campaign in the South primarily focused on the eastern Deccan region along the Bay of Bengal's coast. He began by moving through the forest areas of Madhya Pradesh and proceeded to the Orissa coast. From there, he advanced through the regions of Ganjam, Vizagapatam, Godavari, Krishna, and Nellore, eventually reaching Kanchi (modern-day Kanchipuram) south of present-day Chennai.

There is a theory by Fleet and some scholars suggesting that during his return journey, Samudragupta also conquered kingdoms on the western coast of India. However, evidence from historical inscriptions challenges this view. For example, the inscription mentions Kaurala, identified as Keralaputra (linked to the Chera kingdom of Southern India), and Kottura, identified with a place in Coimbatore. Palakka is equated with Palaghat on the Malabar coast, while Erandapalla is linked to Erandol in the Khandesh district, and Devarashtra is associated with Maharashtra. The sequence of conquests listed in the inscription, however, indicates that Samudragupta's campaign moved steadily southward. The names of regions like Erandapalla and Devarashtra would logically appear after southernmost areas like Vengi and Kanchi if they were actually part of his campaign. Thus, it seems unlikely that he would have turned back to the south after conquering western regions. Instead, the evidence supports the idea that his southern expedition ended at Kanchi, without extending further into western territories like Maharashtra.

==== Mahendra of Kosala ====
The route of Samudragupta's southern campaign can be traced based on the sequence of events recorded in his inscriptions. Leaving the Jumna Valley, he likely advanced through the present-day regions of Rewa and Jabalpur, reaching his first target: the kingdom of Kosala. This kingdom, known as Southern Kosala, had its capital at Sripura (modern-day Sirpur in Central Province). It encompassed the eastern and southern areas of the Central Province, covering the modern districts of Bilaspur, Raipur, Sambalpur, and parts of Ganjam. The ruler of Kosala at the time was King Mahendra.

==== Vyagharaja of Mahakantara ====
Samudragupta then entered the dense Vindhyan wilderness of eastern Gondwana, known as Mahakantara. Its ruler, Vyaghraja—aptly called the "Tiger of the Forest"—was a notable leader and a feudatory of the Vakatakas. Vyaghraja had a son, Jayanatha of the Uchchakalpa dynasty, who is recorded in the year 174 of the Kalachuri era, indicating he was a contemporary of Chandragupta II, and thus, Vyaghraja was a contemporary of Samudragupta. The region's likely capital was Sambalpur on the Mahanadi River.

==== Mantraja of Kurala ====
J.F. Fleet initially suggested that "Kaurālaka," mentioned in Samudragupta's inscriptions, could be a mistake for "Kairalaka," referring to Kerala on India's western coast, possibly due to the unfamiliarity of the name. Others offered varying theories: L.D. Barnet associated it with Korada, while S.K. Aiyangar proposed a location near present-day Khurda in Odisha's Cuttack district. Kielhorn, while studying the Aihole inscription of Pulakesin II, suggested that "Kaurala" (or "Kunala") was likely near the Kollar Lake region between the Godavari and Krishna rivers, a view later accepted by Jayaswal. However, H.C. Raychaudhuri argued that this region would have fallen within the boundaries of Vengi, ruled by Hastivarman. R. Sathianathier proposed an alternative identification with Cherla in Nagpur Taluk of the East Godavari district, but this area, too, was likely within Hastivarman's territory. G. Ramdas speculated it to be the plains northeast of the Mahendra Hills, aligning with the sequence in Samudragupta's inscription. B.V. Krishnarao suggested "Kaurala" might refer to "Kulula," as mentioned in the Mahendragiri pillar inscription of Chola king Rajendra Chola I, situated south of the Maikal range in Madhya Pradesh's Chanda district. However, this location was considered too far north. A recent discovery offers a promising solution: a copper plate grant of Maharaja Narendra from the Sarbhapuriya dynasty of South Kosala references a region called "Mantrarajabhukti," likely named after a ruler called Mantraraja, who may correspond to the "Mantraraja" in Samudragupta's inscriptions. This evidence suggests that the kingdom of "Kurala" was near South Kosala, clarifying its probable location.

==== Mahendragiri of Pishtpura ====
There has been some debate over the correct name of the ruler of Pishtapura. J.F. Fleet argued that a name ending in "giri" was unlikely to be a king's name, as such endings were commonly associated with the Dasanami Gosains, a sect of recluses. Fleet therefore interpreted the ruler's name as simply "Mahendra," with "giri" linked to the following place name, "Kottura," translating it to mean "Kottura on the hill." However, D.R. Bhandarkar countered that this interpretation was grammatically flawed. V.S. Ramachandramurti further noted that several rulers in the Telugu region indeed had names ending in "giri" or its equivalent, "adri," validating "Mahendragiri" as a plausible royal name. Pishtapura, identified as present-day Pithapuram, lies 12 miles from Kakinada in Andhra Pradesh's East Godavari district. This inscription provides the earliest recorded mention of Pishtapura, described in the Ragolu plates of King Vasishthiputra Shaktivarman as a city within the Kalinga territory. It is also referenced in inscriptions of King Anantavarman of Kalinga. In the early 7th century, shortly before 634–635 CE, the Chalukya ruler Pulakesin II conquered Pishtapura and incorporated it into his kingdom.

==== Svamidatta of Kottura ====
After conquering Pishtapura, Samudragupta turned his attention to Kottura, ruled by King Svamidatta. Kottura is identified as either modern Kothoor in the Ganjam district or as a location at the base of the hills in the Vizagapatam (now Visakhapatnam) district.

==== Damana of Erandapalla ====
The location of Erandapalla is essential to defining the southern reach of Samudragupta's campaign. J.F. Fleet identified it with Erandol in East Khandesh, Maharashtra, supported by Gupta-era remains found there. However, Dubreuil disagreed, proposing Erandapali near Srikakulam (Chicacole) based on references in the Siddhantam plates issued by Ganga king Devendravarman, which mention a place named Erandapalli. G. Ramdas offered a different perspective, suggesting either Yendipalli in Golgonda Taluk, Visakhapatnam district, or Endipalli in Ellora Taluka, West Godavari district. He argued that Erandapalli's kingdom likely spanned from the northern boundary of Golgonda Taluk down to Ellore. An "Eradavishaya" appears in the Nagadam plates of Ganga king Vajrahasta (dated to Saka year 979), though it is spelled with a dental "d" rather than the cerebral "d" seen in the Allahabad Pillar inscription. Jayaswal also placed Erandapalli in Kalinga, near Kalinganagara (Mukhalingam) in Ganjam district, suggesting it was under Svamidatta of Pishtapura, with Damana of Erandapalli serving as a local ruler. Ramdas's view, proposing Erandapalli's kingdom stretched from northern Golgonda to Ellore, is widely regarded as the most plausible identification.

==== Vishnugopa of Kanchi ====
We have some information about Vishnugopa, a member of the well-known Pallava dynasty in the south. He was the younger brother of Simhavarman (c. 332–344 CE) and the son of Skandavarman II (c. 297–332 CE). During his brother's reign, Vishnugopa held the title of *Yuvamaharaja* (crown prince) and issued a grant under the name Vishnugopavarman. Later, he served as regent for his nephew, Skandavarman III, suggesting that Samudragupta's invasion may have occurred during this period. The Pallavas’ capital was Kanchi, present-day Kanchipuram in Tamil Nadu.

==== Nilaraja of Avamukta ====
The identity of Avamukta is not very clear. Historian H. C. Raychaudhuri thought that an old seaport named Nilapalli, near Yanam in the Godavari district, might be linked to a king named Nīlarāja. He also mentioned a temple called Avamukteśa in the Anantapur district of Andhra Pradesh. However, the name Avimukteśa is another name for the Hindu god Shiva, and the term Avimuktakshetra usually refers to the area around Varanasi. Another historian, Jayaswal, pointed out two places called Ava and Pithunda mentioned in the Hathigumpha inscription of King Kharavela. He suggested that Pithunda might be the same as Pitundra, a place on the eastern coast mentioned by the ancient Greek geographer Ptolemy. B. V. Krishnarao had a different idea. He suggested that Ava could be the same as a place called Arvarnoi, also mentioned by Ptolemy. He thought this place might refer to Hiranya-rashtra, which is in the Kuddapah and Kurnool districts of Andhra Pradesh.

==== Hastivarman of Vengi ====
Vengi has been identified as the area around Peddavegi in the Krishna district of Andhra Pradesh. The kingdom of Vengi covered the coastal region between the Godavari and Krishna rivers and stretched west to the Ghats mountains. It was a central part of Andhra Pradesh and a major crossroads where roads from different regions like Kalinga, Draviḍa, Karṇāṭa, Mahārāṣṭra, and Kośala met. Vengi played an important role in spreading Indian culture to the islands of the Pacific Ocean. Hastivarmā, a king of Veṅgi, was part of the Śālaṅkāyana dynasty (also known as Vāṅgēyakās) and is known for his many victories. The Śālaṅkāyana dynasty ruled Vengi for three generations before the region briefly came under the control of the Pallavas. Later, it was taken over by the Vishnukundins.

==== Ugrasena of Palakka ====
Ugrasena of Palakka was initially thought by historian Vincent Smith to be connected with Palakkadu, an area in the Palghat division of South Malabar. However, he later changed his mind and agreed with V. Venkayya that Palakka should actually be located in the Nellore district of Andhra Pradesh. Another historian, Hultzsch, did not agree with identifying it with Policut. G. Ramdas mentioned a region called Pakanadu or Panganadu in the inscriptions of the Chola king, Rajaraja Chola. He suggested that it could be the same as Pakkai, an area between Udaygiri and Venkatagiri in the Nellore district. J. Dubreuil believed it was the same place as Palakkada, mentioned in several Pallava inscriptions. For example, the Uruvapalli grant of Yuvamaharaja Vishnugopavarman was issued from Palakkada, which might have been an important center for Pallava rulers. This place seems to have existed during the time of the Gupta king Samudragupta and was governed by a Pallava prince named Ugravamra.

==== Kubera of Devarashtra ====
The historian Fleet initially identified Devarashtra as a region in Maharashtra. However, Dubreuil disagreed and located it in the Yellamanchili Taluk of the Vishakhapatnam district in Andhra Pradesh. Dubreuil based this on mentions of Devarashtra as a "Vishaya" (district) in the Elamanchi Kalingadesha, as seen in the Kasimkot plates of Chalukya king Bhima I. This is further supported by the Srungavarapukota plates of Anantavarman, which were issued from Pishtapura. In these plates, Anantavarman's grandfather, Gunavarman, is referred to as the ruler of Devarashtra. G. Ramdas opposed this idea, arguing that the Vishakhapatnam area should be part of the Pishtapura kingdom. He pointed out that it is unlikely for an independent state to exist within another independent kingdom. However, it seems these small southern kingdoms were quite small, some even smaller than a modern district. The coastal area between the mouths of the Mahanadi and Godavari rivers was divided into three small kingdoms: Kotura, ruled by Svimidatta in the Ganjam district; Devarashtra of Kubera in the Vishakhapatnam district; and Pishtapura, near Mahendragiri in the East Godavari district. Y. R. Gupte presented new evidence linking Devarashtra to Maharashtra. He noted that there is still a village called Devarashtra in the Khanpur Taluk of the Satara district, where the main temple, a Shiva lingam, is named Samudresvara. Gupte believed this preserved the memory of the Gupta emperor Samudragupta. However, most evidence supports the identification of Devarashtra on the eastern coast of India.

==== Dhananjaya of Kusthalapura ====
V.A. Smith believed that Kushtalapura was another name for Kusasthalapura, which is one of the holy cities connected to Dwaraka. However, based on the identifications of Erandapalli and Devarashtra mentioned earlier, it is clear that Samudragupta's military campaign was limited to eastern Deccan, and he did not reach as far west as Saurashtra. Barnet thinks that Kuttalur, located near Polur in the North Arcot district of Andhra Pradesh, is the ancient kingdom of Kushtalapura. On the other hand, B.V. Krishnarao suggests that the present-day town of Kolorupak or Kollipak on the Aleru river, a tributary of the Musi River that flows into the Krishna River, is actually the ancient Kushtalapura. According to him, Kushtalapura is another name for Kusasthalapura, which means "the place of Kusa" (a figure in Hindu mythology). B.V. Krishnarao also says that the leaders of the Kot region (also known as ancient Dhanyakataka) trace their ancestry to a king named Dhananjaya, who was possibly defeated by Samudragupta. This king's territory was in western Andhra, between the Godavari River to the north and the Krishna River to the south.

== Second North Indian Campaign ==
After testing his power through his campaigns in the South, he returned to his kingdom and found that it was surrounded by enemy states that could threaten his rule. So, he decided to become the ruler of these states by waging a "war of destruction" against them. This was a fierce and bloody war fought against the remaining kings of North India who had not been defeated in his earlier campaign.

In line 21 of the Allahabad Inscription, it is stated that Samudragupta greatly increased his glory by forcefully removing many rulers of North India. These rulers included Rudradeva, Matila, Nagadatta, Chandravarman, Ganapatinaga, Nagasena, Achyutanandin, and Balavarman. Their territories are not mentioned because they had become part of the Gupta Empire. Among them, Achyuta, Ganapatinaga, and Nagasena, have been the part of First North Indian Campaign. The poet may have used the shorter name "Achyuta" instead of "Achyutanandin" to fit the meter of the poem.

=== Identification of Rudradeva ===
Harisena informs us that Samudragupta defeated and removed eight kings of North India, including Rudradeva, Matila, Nagadatta, Chandravarman, Ganapatinaga, Nagasena, Achyutanandi, and Balavarman. There were likely other kings involved whose names aren't mentioned, possibly because they were less important. The fact that so many kings are mentioned suggests that during this time, Northern India was divided into many small states, many of which were ruled by the Nagas, who had liberated the Ganges and Yamuna valleys from the Kushanas before the rise of the Guptas. It is possible that these Naga rulers united to protect their newly gained power and resisted Samudragupta together. However, it is incorrect to agree with Jayaswal's theory that Samudragupta fought against the Vakataka empire, with Rudradeva being identified as Rudrasena I of the Vakataka dynasty. This identification, first suggested by K.N. Dikshit, is not supported. The Vakataka kingdom was located in the south (Dakshinapatha), while Rudradeva is clearly listed as one of the kings of North India (Aryavarta), which was in the north. Additionally, Rudradeva is specifically mentioned as being defeated and his kingdom annexed, which does not apply to Rudrasena I of the Vakatakas. The Balaghat plates of Prithivishena II show that the Vakataka kingdom was thriving for a hundred years, indicating the continuity of the Vakataka dynasty, which contradicts the idea of Rudrasena I being defeated by Samudragupta. Furthermore, the title of Maharaja used for Rudrasena I in Vakataka inscriptions, compared to the title of Samrat given to his father Pravarasena I (due to his performance of the Vajapeya sacrifice), does not support the claim that Rudrasena I was defeated by Samudragupta. The Vakataka kings, including Narendrasena, were all referred to as Maharajas, and only Pravarasena I was called Samrat. Thus, identifying Rudradeva as Rudrasena I is rejected by most scholars. Another suggestion is to identify Rudradeva with a Western Kshatrapa ruler, such as Rudradaman II or Rudrasena III, but this also seems unlikely. There is no indication that Samudragupta would have clashed with these rulers from far-off Ujjain without first dealing with the Saka ruler Sridharavarman of Eran and the Nagas of Vidisha. The identification of Rudradeva with Rudra, whose coin was found at Kaushambi and is believed to date to the fourth century A.D., is more widely accepted. The style of writing on the coin is similar to that found in the pillar inscription, as suggested by Guptas, making this identification more plausible.

=== Matila ===
The name Matila could be a diminutive form of names like Matideva, Matidasa, or Matidatta, similar to how Devila is derived from Devadatta. However, Matila's identity is not clearly established. Some scholars have suggested he might be the same as Mattila, a name found on a clay seal discovered in Bulandshahr (Uttar Pradesh). However, other scholars have disagreed, arguing that since the seal does not have an honorific title before the name, it may belong to a trader or a minor chief rather than a significant ruler.

=== Nagadatta ===
Nagadatta is most likely a Naga king, though scholars have offered different identifications. Jayaswal identified him as the father of Maharaja Mahesvaranaga, but this identification cannot be accepted because the seal clearly names Mahesvaranaga's father as Nagabhatta, not Nagadatta. D.C. Sircar, on the other hand, identified Nagadatta as a king from North Bengal, an ancestor of the Datta family, who later served as viceroys under the Guptas. This identification seems more plausible for now, until further evidence can provide a more definitive answer. Nagadatta may have originally ruled a Naga kingdom, and after losing his independent status, his successors may have been appointed as viceroys in Bengal.

=== Chandravarman ===
Chandravarman has been identified with the king mentioned in the Susunia Hill inscription near Bankura district in Bengal, where he is described as the son of Simhavarman and the king of Pushkarana, which is identified with modern Pokharan, located about 25 miles from Susunia Hill. However, this identification has been questioned by P.L. Gupta, who argued that most of Bengal was already part of the Gupta Empire, and no king of Bengal seems to be mentioned in the inscription. We do not fully agree with Gupta's view because the Allahabad inscription only mentions "Samatata," which refers to the southeastern part of Bengal, under the influence of Samudragupta. It does not refer to the entire region of Bengal. In fact, the first epigraphic reference to Samatata is found in this inscription, which suggests that it was a distinct region and not fully absorbed into the Gupta Empire at the time. Gupta's suggestion that Chandravarman might be identified with the Mandasor ruler, a brother of Naravarman and Simhavarman, has also been dismissed by most scholars. This is because Samatata is described as a frontier state outside the sphere of Aryavarta, and all the North Indian rulers were defeated and their territories annexed to the Gupta Empire. If Chandravarman had been the ruler of the Mandasor region, it would imply he was a feudatory of the Gupta Empire, particularly during the reign of Chandragupta II, the son of Samudragupta. Additionally, the shared name of the father could be a coincidence, as such names were common in that period. Thus, while there are various theories, the identification of Chandravarman with the ruler from the Susunia inscription seems more plausible, given the available evidence.

=== Balavarman ===
K.N. Dikshit identified Balavarma as an ancestor of King Bhaskarvarma of Kamarupa (Assam), who lived eight generations before Bhaskarvarma, during the time of Harshavardhana. By assuming an average of 20 years per generation, this would place Balavarma around 160 years before Bhaskarvarma, or around A.D. 446. This timeline suggests that Balavarma could not have been a contemporary of Samudragupta. V.V. Mirashi, on the other hand, proposed that Balavarma belonged to the Magha dynasty of Kaushambi (Kosam). Alternatively, Balavarma could be seen as a successor of Rajan Mahakshatrapa Śridharavarman, a Saka ruler known from inscriptions to have ruled over the Eran-Sanchi region. After Śridharavarman's reign, we know that Samudragupta took control of the region, as evidenced by his inscription found at Eran. It is reasonable to infer that the Saka dynasty was overthrown by Samudragupta, and Balavarman, who was defeated by him, belonged to this Saka dynasty. This victory would have brought the entire eastern Malwa region under Samudragupta's direct rule.

=== Conquest of Forest Kingdoms ===
After the conquest of the Aryavarta rulers, as mentioned in line 21 of the inscription, it is stated that Samudragupta reduced the rulers of all the forest kingdoms to complete subjection. In the language of the inscription, these rulers were made servants (parichārakikrita - sarvvālavika-rājasya). One of the forest kingdoms mentioned is Dabhala (modern Jabalpur), which, along with eighteen other forest kingdoms, is referred to in two Gupta-era inscriptions from the Baghelkhand region, dated 199 and 209 CE. The term *Ātavika-rāja* in the inscription therefore refers to the king of Dabhala and the surrounding wild territories, corresponding to the region around present-day Jabalpur in Madhya Pradesh. Some scholars have attempted to include Alvaka (Ghazipur, Uttar Pradesh) as part of this list of forest kingdoms. However, this area was already part of Samudragupta's empire, and in the present context, the inscription specifically refers to the territory around Jabalpur.

=== Conquest of Frontier States ===
In the fourth category mentioned in line 22 of the inscription, the kings of the frontier states of Samatata, Davaka, Kamarupa, Nepal, and the tribal states of the Malavas, Arjunayanas, Yaudheyas, Madrakas, Abhiras, Prajunas, Sanakanikas, Kakas, Kharaparikas, and others are listed. These rulers acknowledged Samudragupta's authority by paying various taxes, obeying his orders, and showing respect by attending his court in person.

==== Samatata ====
Starting from the East, Harisena first mentions Samatata. The earliest mention of this country in literature is found in the Brihatsamhita of Varahamihira. Fleet explains the name as referring to a country with rivers that have flat and level banks on both sides, which describes lower Bengal. Smith notes that the name Samatata highlights the difference in appearance between the swamps of deltaic Bengal and the drier regions of Bihar and the North-Western Provinces. From the Ashrafpur plates and the account of I-tsing, we learn that during the seventh century, Samatata was ruled by the Khadaga dynasty, with its capital at Karmmanta (modern Kamta), about 12 miles west of Comilla. Under these kings, Samatata included the districts of Tippera, Noakhali, Barisal, Faridpur, and the eastern half of Dacca.

==== Dvaka ====
Davaka is identified with the modern place called Daboka in the Nowgong District of Assam.

==== Kamarupa ====
Kamarupa consisted of the western districts of the Brahmaputra valley. It was the most powerful state in the region and the first to be approached from the western side, so it came to represent the entire valley. Pragjyotish is identified as the capital of Kamarupa, which is associated with the city of Kamakhya or modern-day Gauhati.

==== Nepala ====
In Nepal, Jaydeva I, the Lichchhavi king, was related to Samudragupta. His submission to Samudragupta effectively meant the submission of the Himalayan states on the Indian side. During Jayadeva's reign, the Gupta Era was introduced in Nepal.

==== Kartipura ====
This kingdom likely covered the lower ranges of the western Himalayas, including areas like Kumaun, Almora, Garhwal, and Kangra. Upon reconsideration, we no longer support the earlier suggestion by Dashratha Sharma that identified it with Kahror or Karur, located between Multan and Loni.

=== Conquest of Tribal States ===
The earlier survey of the frontier kingdoms covers the eastern and northern edges of Samudragupta's empire. Next, Samudragupta moved to the west, where he finds a series of states starting from the southern parts of Rajasthan and stretching through Haryana and Punjab, reaching up to the Chenab River in Pakistan. Here, tribal republics like the Malavas, Arjunayanas, Yaudheyas, and Madrakas. Other tribes include the Abhiras, Prarjunas, Sanakanikas, Kakas, and Kharaparikas were conquered by Samudragupta.

==== Malavas ====
The tribe known as Malloi (similar to the Greeks) originally belonged to the Jhang district in Punjab (now part of Pakistan) and spread throughout Punjab. By the time of Samudragupta, they had moved to Rajasthan. They settled around Karkotanagar, near Tonk, where many of their coins have been discovered. These coins date from the 2nd century BCE to the early 4th century CE. The migration from Punjab to Rajasthan is supported by the fact that inscriptions on some of the coins found in Rajasthan were written from right to left, similar to the Kharoshthi script, which was common in Punjab and the northwest region in ancient times.

==== Arjunayanas ====
The Arjunayanas are an ancient tribe. They are mentioned by Panini. Varahamihira includes them with the Sarasvatas and Matsyas. According to historian Allan, the territory of the Arjunayanas was located in the region forming a triangle between Delhi, Jaipur, and Agra. This area partially covered Matsya and its surrounding regions.

==== Yaudheyas ====
During Samudragupta's time, the Yaudheyas occupied northern parts of Rajasthan (Rajputana) and southeastern Punjab. Their territory stretched up to the area near Bahawalpur State, where the region called Johiyawar still carries their name. They played a significant role in pushing back the Kushana rulers from the interior of India around the middle of the 2nd century CE. Known for their bravery, the Yaudheyas likely formed a confederation, joining forces with nearby tribes such as the Arjunayanas and Kunindas. According to historian P.L. Gupta, by the 3rd century CE, they had settled between the upper Sutlej and Beas rivers, with their main centre at Sunet, near Ludhiana, marking the northwestern boundary of Samudragupta's empire, as they were paying tribute to him.

==== Madarakas ====
The Madras originally came from Sialkot (Madradesa), now in Pakistan. They were known as a group of warriors and held the title of Rajan (king), as mentioned in Kautilya's Arthashastra. The story of Savitri and Satyavana is linked to this region since Savitri was the daughter of Asvapati, the king of Madra. The area, known as Sakala, was located in the land between two rivers called the Rechna Doab. The Madras were divided into two branches: Purva Madra (East Madra), which extended from the Ravi River to the Chenab River, and Apara Madra (West Madra), which stretched from the Chenab to the Jhelum River, as described by Panini. Historian P.L. Gupta suggested that they might have also lived in a region of Rajasthan near Bikaner, in a place called Bhadra, during Samudragupta's conquests. His idea was based on the similarity of the names "Madra" and "Bhadra," but this view is not widely accepted, as evidence shows they were two distinct tribes.

==== Abhiras ====
The Abhiras are believed to have originally come from the region between Herat and Kandahar. They were considered to be foreigners and served as generals in the armies of the Saka Satraps of Western India. Around 248 CE, an Abhira king named Iswarasena ruled in the Maharashtra region. During Samudragupta's time, most scholars place the Abhiras in the area known as Abhirawada, between Jhansi and Bhilsa in Madhya Pradesh, where they seem to have established a kingdom. However, P.L. Gupta suggests that they had not settled in this area yet and likely remained in the lower Indus Valley and Western Punjab, though he does not provide specific reasons for this view. Diskalkar offers a different perspective, noting that the Abhiras are frequently mentioned in the Kshatrapa inscriptions of Saurashtra, indicating their presence in Kathiawad and Gujarat. Ancient texts like the Puranas and the Brihatsamhita place the Abhiras in the southern regions of India during Samudragupta's era. Over time, the Abhiras spread to various parts of India, and they may have moved into Ahirwada in Madhya Pradesh later on. Their presence in Rajasthan is also noted later, as evidenced by a Jodhpur inscription from the year 918 CE, which describes the Abhiras as a fearsome and aggressive group, causing terror among their neighbours.

==== Prarjunas ====
Scholars have generally identified the Prarjunas as being located in the Narasimhpur district of the Central Provinces (modern-day Madhya Pradesh). However, P.L. Gupta disagrees with this view. Based on Kautilya's reference to the Prarjunakas alongside the Gandharas, he suggests they were in the northwest region of India. A more likely location for the Prarjunas, though, is Narasimhagarh in Central India. This conclusion is supported by the proximity of other tribal states mentioned in inscriptions, such as the Sanakanikas, Kakas, and Kharaparikas, which were mostly within the boundaries of Central India. Therefore, placing the Prarjunas in the Central Provinces seems more plausible. Historian Bhandarkar also supports this view, positioning them near Narasimhagarh, close to Bhilsa (modern Vidisha).

==== Sanakanikas ====
The Sanakanikas, an indigenous tribe, were gradually influenced by Sanskrit culture. They appear to have been governed by hereditary chiefs, as indicated by the use of the title Maharaja by a Sanakanika feudatory of Chandragupta II, as well as his father and grandfather. The tribe is believed to have been located near Bhilsa (modern Vidisha). The Sanakanikas are also mentioned in the Udayagiri Cave Inscription of Chandragupta II, suggesting their presence in the Isagarh district, near Gwalior, close to Bhilsa. This indicates their integration into the political framework of the Gupta Empire during that period.

==== Kakas ====
The Kakas were a tribe that lived near the region of Sanchi, which was historically known as Kakanadabota. They are mentioned in the Mahabharata and are associated with the Vidarbhas, a prominent group of people who occupied areas in what is now Madhya Pradesh. This connection suggests that the Kakas were part of the broader cultural and geographical landscape of central India during ancient times.

==== Kharaparikas ====
The Kharaparikas were a tribe placed in the Damoh district of Madhya Pradesh. The name Kharpara translates to a thief, rogue, or cheat. It is unclear if they can be directly linked to the "five Karpatas" mentioned in the Mahabharata or the Khara-Sagara-Rasis (Kharapatha) of the Puranas. Most scholars identify them with the Kharaparikas referenced in the Batihgarh inscription from the Damoh district. Historian Dashrath Sharma's theory that associated the Kharaparikas with the Mongols was refuted by S.L. Katre, indicating a more localized origin for this tribe rather than a connection to the Mongol people.

=== Foreign Kingdoms ===
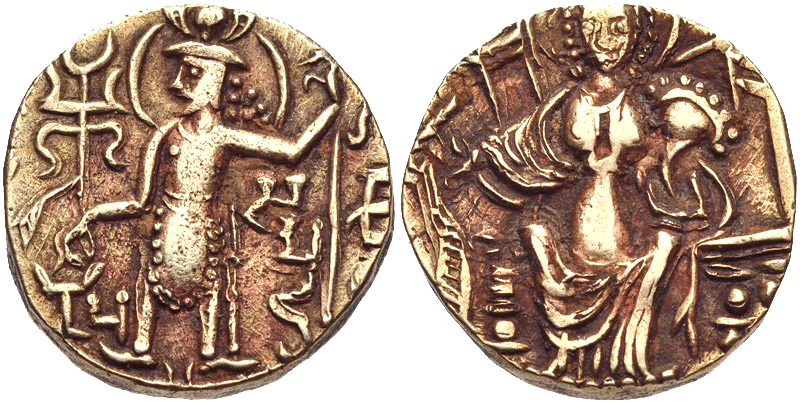
Coin minted in the Punjab area with the name "Samudra" ( Sa-mu-dra), derived from the style of late Kushan Empire coinage, and tamgha. These atypical coins follow the fall of the last Kushan ruler Kipunada, and just precede the coinage of the first Kidarite Huns in northwestern India. Circa CE 350–375.

The Allahabad inscription (lines 23-24) states that several groups, including the Daivaputras, Sahis, Sahanushahis, Sakas, Murundas, and the people from Simhala (Sri Lanka) and various islands, recognized the suzerainty of Samudragupta. They expressed their submission through various acts of service. They came personally to pay homage, offered gifts such as maidens and other presents, and requested official charters marked with the Gupta imperial Garuda seal. These charters ensured that they could continue enjoying and administering their respective territories without disturbance. This indicates the widespread acceptance of Samudragupta's authority and the diplomatic ties he established with distant regions.

==== Daivaputra-Sahi-Sahunasahi ====
R.C. Majumdar explains that the titles Daivaputra, Sahi, and Sahanushahi were used by the Kushana kings. The entire expression may refer to one of the Kushana rulers or, as some scholars suggest, could denote three distinct smaller states that emerged from the fragmented Kushana Empire, with each ruler adopting one of these titles. In previous research, it was concluded that Daivaputra, derived from Devaputra, referred to the descendants of Devaputra, specifically the Kushana ruler Kanishka. The term Sahi likely referred to leaders from a sub-branch of the Kushanas, possibly aligning with the Jain legend of Kalakacharya. Meanwhile, Sahanushahi was interpreted as a title for the Sasanian rulers. Historian R.K. Mookerjee suggests that the Daivaputras controlled the Central Punjab region, while the Sahis and Sahanushahis governed territories beyond the Punjab, extending into areas corresponding to modern-day Afghanistan. This reflects the political fragmentation and distribution of power following the decline of the unified Kushana Empire.

==== Sakas ====
During Samudragupta's reign, the Sakas were a significant power, ruling over regions such as Malwa (Ujjain) and Kathiawar. Although they acknowledged Samudragupta's supremacy, their homage was insincere and unreliable, as it did not extend to his successor. This lack of genuine submission became evident during the reign of Chandragupta II. He had to reconquer these territories, defeating the Sakas decisively, which earned him the title "Shakari" meaning "enemy of the Sakas." This conquest solidified Gupta control over western India and marked the decline of Saka power in the region.

There is an alternate view suggesting that the Sakas mentioned in the context of the inscriptions were not the Western Kshatrapas but rather the Sakas of the northern regions. These northern Sakas had their coins imitated by Samudragupta. The coins in question were similar to the Kushan types, featuring the Ardochsho (goddess of fortune) on the reverse side, and included the title Śaka along with the initials of the individual rulers, inscribed in Brahmi script. These coins from the Saka (Kushan) rulers of the Punjab region were distinct from the coins of the Kushan kings of Kabul, which featured the Oesho (a depiction of the deity Shiva) on the reverse. The coinage of the Kabul-based Kushans did not have any influence on Samudragupta's coin designs.

==== Murundas ====
The tribe was one of the foreign rulers who willingly offered allegiance to Samudragupta. Earlier scholars' suggestions to identify them with the Sakas or Kushanas have been dismissed, as the Kushanas were already included under the Daivaputras, and the Sakas were mentioned separately. The name is non-Indian and has no Indian origin. Old lexicons equate them with the Lampakas, the people of modern Laghman in Afghanistan. They lived in the northwest among other foreign tribes and should not be confused with the indigenous Munda tribes of the Chota-Nagpur region.

==== Saimhalaka ====
The inscription mentions that the island of Simhala (Sri Lanka) and other nearby islands gave presents to Samudragupta, and this is supported by historical records. The Chinese writer Wang Hiuen-tsang tells us that the king of Ceylon, named Chi-mi-kia-po-mo (likely Sri Megha-Varman or Varna, who ruled from around 350-380 AD), sent an embassy with gifts to Samudragupta. The king also asked for permission to build a monastery in Bodh-Gaya for Ceylonese pilgrims. The inscription doesn't just mention Ceylon, but also refers to other islands where Gupta influence reached. Although it doesn't name these islands, it's believed to include places in the Indian Archipelago, such as Java, which is part of what is now called Indonesia.

== Aftermath and legacy ==
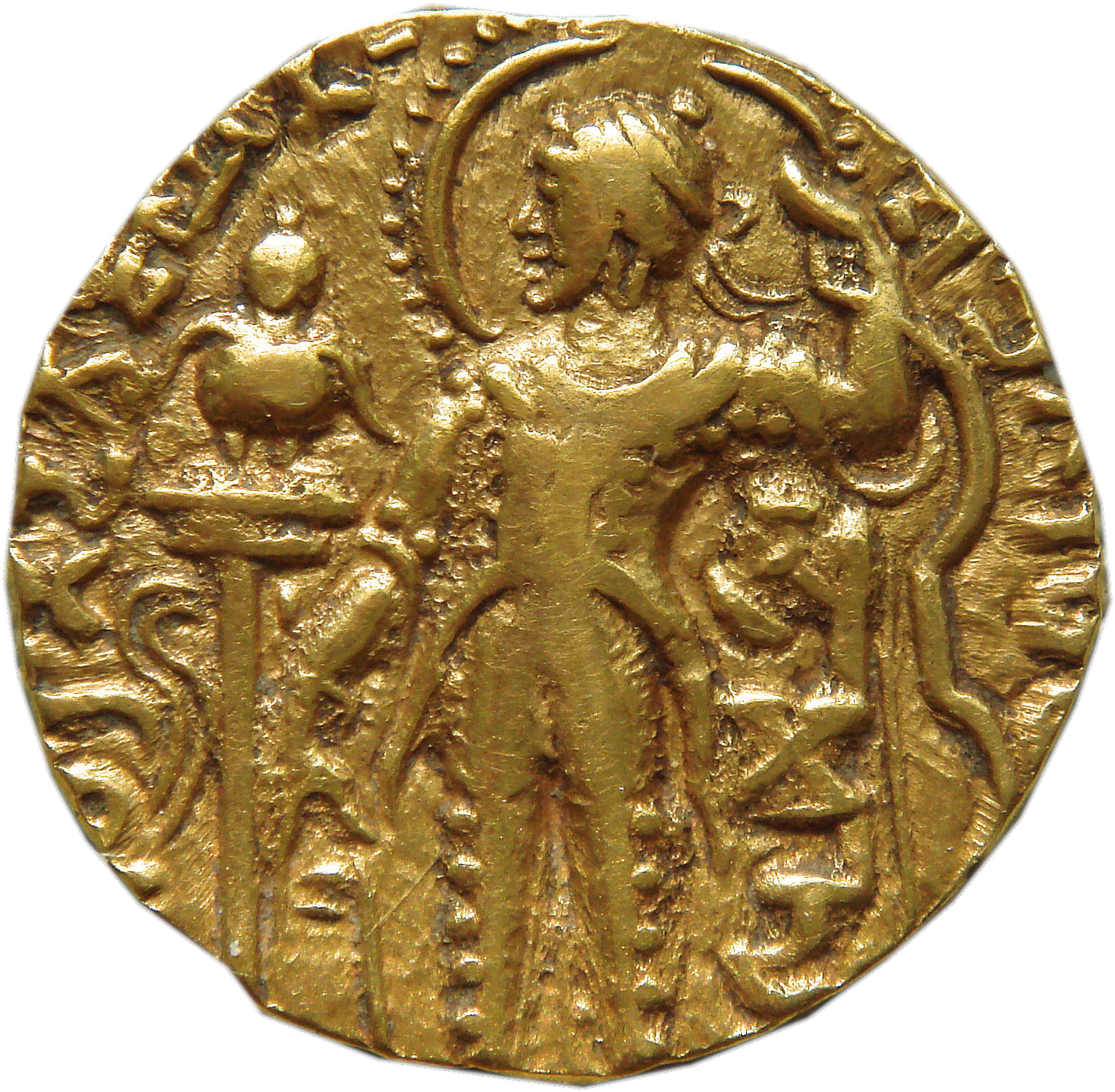
Coin of Samudragupta, with Garuda pillar, emblem of Gupta Empire. The name Sa-mu-dra in an early version of the Gupta Brahmi script, appears vertically under the left arm of the emperor.

The part of the inscription ends by mentioning that, in addition to the nine kings who were defeated by Samudragupta, there were many other kings of Aryavarta whose territories were also taken over by him. As a result of his two military campaigns, Samudragupta conquered all the small kingdoms of North India, bringing the entire region under his rule as its supreme leader. This unification of North India, which had been divided into many small states, was one of Samudragupta's greatest achievements and helped create the Gupta Empire. The term "Aryavarta" here refers to the area between the Himalayas and the Vindhya Mountains, and between the western and eastern seas, as described in ancient texts.

Samudragupta celebrated his victories by performing the Ashvamedha, a horse-sacrifice ceremony that had not been performed for a long time. His successors praised him for reviving this ceremony. The Allahabad inscription does not mention this event because the ceremony took place after the inscription was made, once all his conquests had been completed. However, his coins provide evidence of the ceremony. These coins, called Ashvamedha coins, show a horse in front of a sacrificial pillar on one side, with the queen (who was needed for the ceremony) and the legend "Ashvamedha-parakramaḥ" on the other side. The full legend on the front of the coin reads: "The king of kings, having conquered the earth, now conquers heaven with invincible valour." This shows that the Ashvamedha ceremony came after his military victories. "Conquering heaven" means achieving spiritual success, which was believed to be done through good deeds and religious ceremonies like the Ashvamedha. There are other references to the horse-sacrifice in inscriptions. The Eran stone inscription mentions "Suvarnadāne" (the distribution of gold), and another inscription talks about giving many cows and crores of gold coins. In the Poona plate of Prabhavatigupta (Samudragupta's granddaughter), he is described as "one who performed many horse-sacrifices." There is also a possible reference to the ceremony in the inscription "ddaguttassa deyadhamma," found on a horse figure at the Lucknow Provincial Museum, and on a seal showing a horse with the word "parākrama" (meaning "valour").

Samudragupta expanded his empire to include the northern regions and incorporated various territories into his rule. He brought under his control the chiefs of the wild tribes along the Yamuna River and in the valleys of the Vindhya Mountains. His empire spread eastward to the Assam, to the north by the Himalayas, to the west by the Sutlej River, and to the south by the Narmada River. Beyond these limits, he held influence over the frontier kingdoms of the Ganges delta and the southern slopes of the Himalayas, as well as over free tribes in regions like Malwa and the Deccan. His successful raids extended as far as the extremes of the Punjab, bringing twelve southern kingdoms under temporary rule. Along his north-western frontier, Samudra Gupta maintained strong diplomatic relations with the Kushan rulers of Kabul and Gandhara, and likely with the Sassanid Empire of Persia. The results of his southern campaign reached as far as Ceylon (Sri Lanka) and other islands, where he received embassies and complimentary gifts from distant and foreign lands.

== Sources ==
- Ashvini Agrawal (1989). Rise and Fall of the Imperial Guptas. Motilal Banarsidass. ISBN 978-81-208-0592-7.
- K. Chakrabarti (1996). "Origin and political history of the Guptas". In Ahmad Hasan Dani; B. A. Litvinsky (eds.). History of Civilizations of Central Asia: The crossroads of civilizations, A.D. 250 to 750. UNESCO. ISBN 978-92-3-103211-0.
- Dikshitar, V. R. Ramachandra (1993), The Mauryan Polity, Motilal Banarsidass Publ., ISBN 978-81-208-1023-5
- R. C. Majumdar (1981). A Comprehensive History of India. Vol. 3, Part I: A.D. 300–985. Indian History Congress / People's Publishing House. OCLC 34008529.
