= Mahendra of Dakshina Kosala =

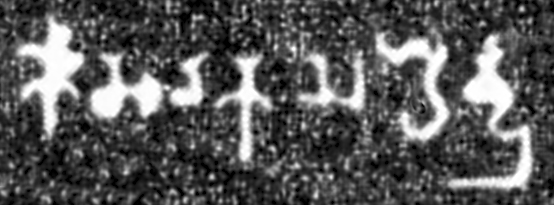
"Mahendra of Kosala" (Brahmi script: Kausalaka Mahendra) in Line 19 of the Allahabad Pillar inscription of Samudragupta (r.350-375 CE)

Mahendra was a king of Dakshina Kosala, whose identity is not completely verified, and is mentioned as a king of Dakshinapatha or Southern India. He was one of the many kings who were subjugated, captured and later released by the powerful Gupta emperor Samudragupta on his Dakshinapatha (Southern India) campaign. Mahendra of Kosala was one of the southern kings of Dakshinapatha paying allegiance and tribute to Samudragupta. His dynasty is uncertain, though some historians suggest that he was from the Kosala branch of the Mahameghavahana dynasty. This branch of the Mahameghavahana dynasty is often identified with the Meghas of Kosala, who ruled over Kosala from the 3rd century AD to the 6th century AD.

Other theories suggest that he was a king of a branch the Ikshvaku dynasty, who had established a mighty kingdom in the south. Yet another theory identifies Mahendra with a Nala king named Mahendraditya.

== Allahabad stone pillar inscription of Samudragupta ==
The Allahabad stone pillar inscription of Samudragupta's lines which include Mahendra's name in it goes as follows-

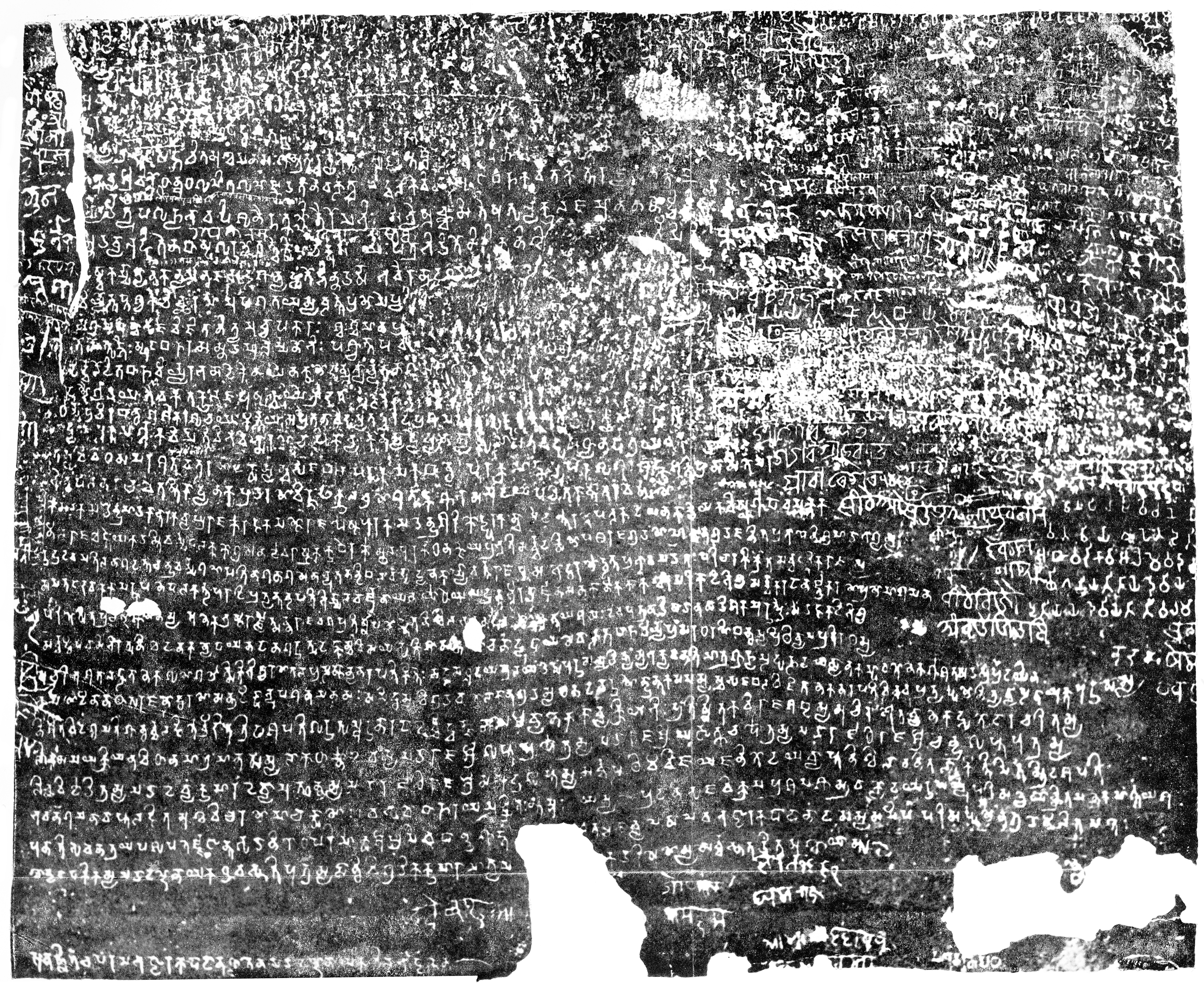
Allahabad Pillar inscription of Samudragupta (r.350-375 CE).

- (Lines 19–20) Whose magnanimity blended with valour was caused by (his) first capturing, and thereafter showing the favour of releasing, all the kings of Dakshiṇāpatha such as Mahēndra of Kōsala, Vyāghrarāja of Mahākāntāra, Maṇṭarāja of Kurāḷa, Mahēndragiri of Pishṭapura, Svāmidatta of Kōṭṭūra, Damana of Ēraṇḍapalla, Vishṇugōpa of Kāñchī, Nīlarāja of Avamukta, Hastivarman of Vēṅgī, Ugrasēna of Pālakka, Kubēra of Dēvarāshṭra, and Dhanañjaya of Kusthalapura.
