= Samudragupta =

Gupta emperor from 335 to 375

- Mahārājādhirāja; Chakravarti; Samrat
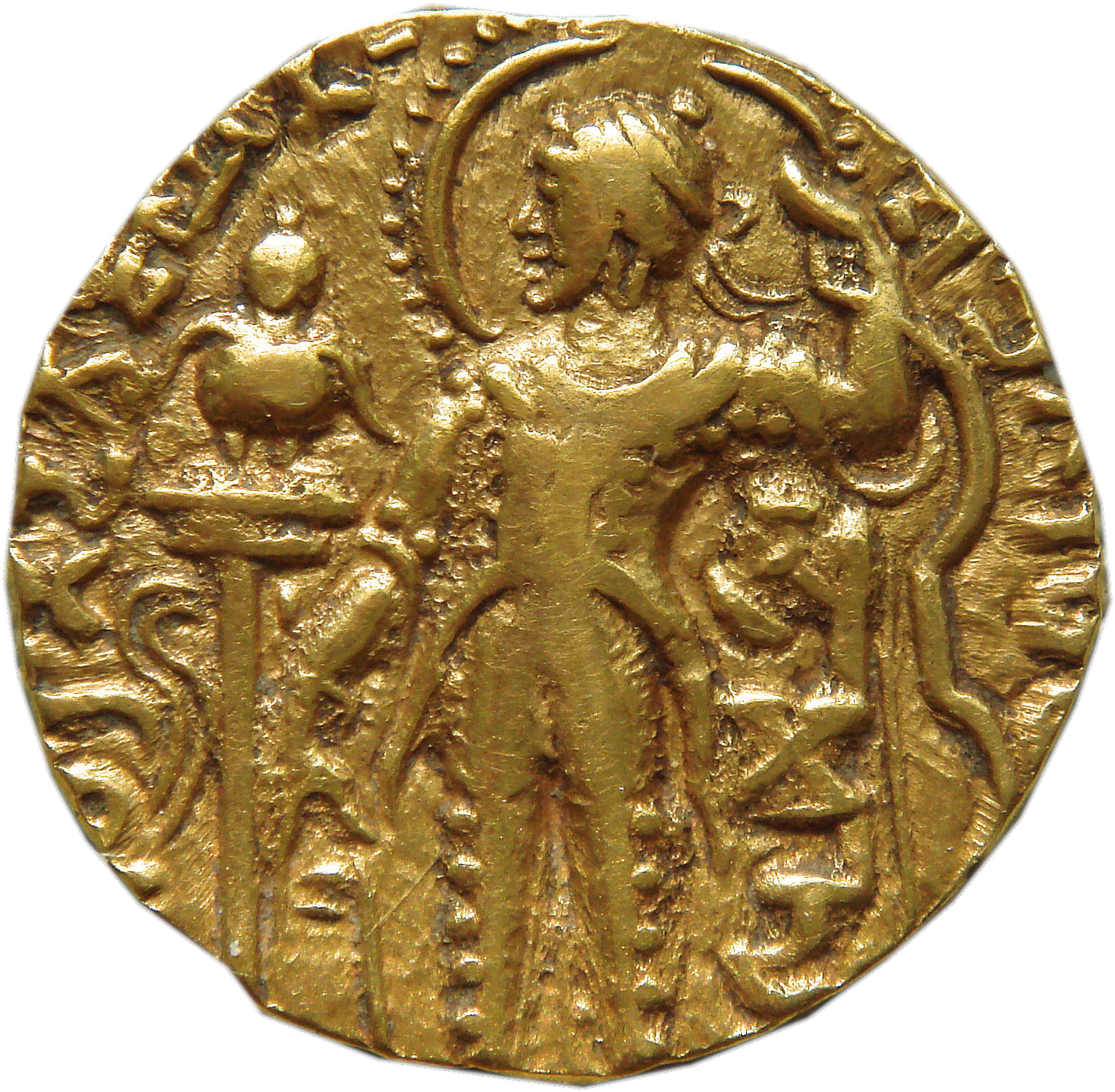
- Coin of Samudragupta, with Garuda pillar, emblem of Gupta Empire. The name Sa-mu-dra in an early version of the Gupta Brahmi script, appears vertically under the left arm of the emperor.

Gupta emperor
- Reign: c. 335–375
- Coronation: c. 335
- Predecessor: Chandragupta I, possibly Kacha
- Successor: Chandragupta II, or possibly Ramagupta
- Born: 318; Gupta Empire
- Died: 375 (aged 56–57); Gupta Empire
- Spouse: Dattadevi
- Issue: Chandragupta II, and possibly Ramagupta
- House: Gupta Dynasty
- Father: Chandragupta I
- Mother: Kumaradevi
- Religion: Hinduism
- Military career
- Allegiance: Gupta Empire
- Branch: Gupta Army
- Rank: Supreme commander
- Conflicts: See list: Wars of Samudragupta; Northern Campaigns; Conquest of Aryavarta; Defeat of Naga rulers; Defeat of Arjunayanas; Defeat of Vanga; Western and Central Campaigns; Gupta–Saka Wars (Defeat of Western Kshatrapas); War with the Abhiras; Gupta–Vakataka Conflicts; Conquest of Forest Kingdoms; Southern Campaigns; Siege of Kanchi (Defeat of Pallavas); Subjugation of Kadambas; Subjugation of Kalinga; Eastern Campaigns; Subjugation of Kamarupa, Devaka, and Nepala; Northwestern Campaigns; Subjugation of Gandhara; Subjugation of Kushano-Sassanians

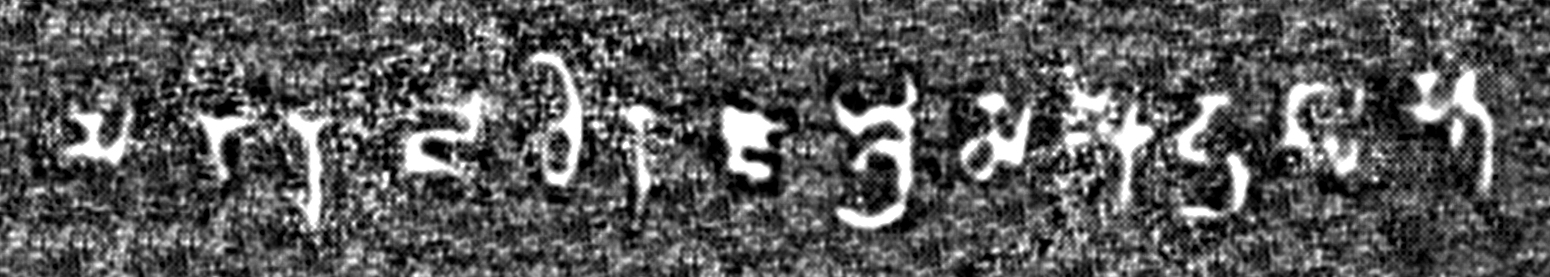
Inscription: Mahārājadhirāja Shrī Samudragupta "Great King of Kings, Lord Samudragupta" in the Gupta script, on the Allahabad pillar Samudragupta inscription.

Samudragupta (Gupta script: Sa-mu-dra-gu-pta; 318–375) was the second emperor of the Gupta Empire of ancient India. As a son of the Gupta emperor Chandragupta I and the Licchavi princess Kumaradevi, he inherited the kingdom and transformed it into a vast empire through his military campaigns.

The Allahabad Pillar inscription, a prashasti (eulogy) composed by his courtier Harisena, credits him with extensive military conquests. It suggests that he defeated several kings of northern India, and annexed their territories into his empire. He also marched along the southeastern coast of India, advancing as far south as Kanchipuram in the Pallava kingdom. In addition, he subjugated several frontier kingdoms and tribal oligarchies. At the height of his power, his empire under his direct control extended from Ravi River in the west (present-day Punjab) to the Brahmaputra River in the east (present-day Assam), and from the Himalayan foothills in the north to central India in the southwest; several rulers along the southeastern coast were also his tributaries. The inscription also states that many neighbouring rulers tried to please him, which probably refers to his friendly relations with them.

He performed the Ashvamedha sacrifice to prove his imperial sovereignty and remained undefeated in battle. His gold coins and inscriptions suggest that he was an accomplished poet, and also played musical instruments such as the veena. His expansionist policy was continued by his son and successor Chandragupta II.

== Period ==
Modern scholars variously assign the start of Samudragupta's reign from c. 319 CE to c. 350 CE.

The inscriptions of the Gupta kings are dated in the Gupta calendar era, whose epoch is generally dated to c. 319 CE. However, the identity of the era's founder is a matter of debate, and scholars variously attribute its establishment to Chandragupta I or Samudragupta. Chandragupta I probably had a long reign, as the Prayag Pillar inscription suggests that he appointed his son as his successor, presumably after reaching an old age. However, the exact period of his reign is uncertain. For these reasons, the beginning of Samudragupta's reign is also uncertain.

If Samudragupta is regarded as the founder of the Gupta era, his ascension can be dated to c. 319–320 CE. On the other hand, if his father Chandragupta I is regarded as the founder of the Gupta era, Samudragupta's ascension must be dated to a later date. Samudragupta was a contemporary of King Meghavarna of the Anuradhapura Kingdom, but the regnal period of this king is also uncertain. According to the traditional reckoning adopted in Sri Lanka for Buddha's death, he ruled during 304–332 CE; but the modified chronology adopted by modern scholars such as Wilhelm Geiger assigns his reign to 352–379 CE. Accepting the former date would place Samudragupta's ascension to c. 320 CE; accepting the latter date would place it around c. 350 CE.

The end of Samudragupta's reign is also uncertain. Samudragupta's granddaughter Prabhavatigupta is known to have married during the reign of his son Chandragupta II, in c. 380 CE (assuming c. 319 CE as the epoch of the Gupta era). Therefore, the end of Samudragupta's reign can be placed before this year.

Various estimates of Samudragupta's regnal period include:

- A. S. Altekar: c. 330–370 CE
- A. L. Basham: c. 335–376 CE
- S. R. Goyal: c. 350–375 CE
- Tej Ram Sharma: c. 353–373 CE

== Ascension ==
Samudragupta was a son of the Gupta emperor Chandragupta I and Queen Kumaradevi, who came from the Licchavi clan. His fragmentary Eran stone inscription states that his father selected him as the successor because of his "devotion, righteous conduct, and valour". His Allahabad Pillar inscription similarly describes how Chandragupta I called him a noble person in front of the courtiers, and appointed him to "protect the earth". These descriptions suggest that Chandragupta I renounced the throne in his old age, and appointed his son as the next emperor.

According to the Allahabad Pillar inscription, when Chandragupta I appointed him as the next emperor, the faces of other people of "equal birth" bore a "melancholy look". One interpretation suggests that these other people were neighbouring kings, and Samudagupta's ascension to the throne was uncontested. Another theory is that these other people were Gupta princes with a rival claim to the throne. If Emperor Chandragputa I indeed had multiple sons, it is likely that Samudragupta's background as the son of a Lichchhavi princess worked in his favour.

The coins of a Gupta ruler named Kacha, whose identity is debated by modern scholars, describe him as "the exterminator of all kings". These coins closely resemble the coins issued by Samudragupta. According to one theory, Kacha was an earlier name of Samudragupta and the emperor later adopted the regnal name Samudra ("Ocean"), after extending his empire's dominion as far as the ocean. An alternative theory is that Kacha was a distinct king (possibly a rival claimant to the throne) who flourished before or after Samudragupta.

== Military campaigns & territorial expansion ==
Possible extent of the Gupta Empire, near the end of Samudragupta's reign, c. 375 CE

The Gupta inscriptions suggest that Samudragupta had a remarkable military career. The Eran stone inscription of Samudragupta states that he had brought "the whole tribe of kings" under his suzerainty, and that his enemies were terrified when they thought of him in their dreams. The inscription does not name any of the defeated kings (presumably because its primary objective was to record the installation of a Vishnu idol in a temple), but it suggests that Samudragupta had subdued several kings by this time. The later Allahabad Pillar inscription, a panegyric written by Samudragupta's minister and military officer Harishena, credits him with extensive conquests. It gives the most detailed account of Samudragupta's military conquests, listing them in mainly geographical and partly chronological order. It states that Samudragupta fought a hundred battles, acquired a hundred wounds that looked like marks of glory, and earned the title Prakrama (valourous). The Mathura stone inscription of Chandragupta II describes Samudragupta as an "exterminator of all kings", as someone who had no equally powerful enemy, and as a person whose "fame was tasted by the waters of the four oceans".

Modern scholars offer various opinions regarding Samudragupta's possible motivations behind his extensive military campaigns. The Allahabad Pillar inscription suggests that Samudragupta's aim was the unification of the earth (dharani-bandha), which suggests that he may have aspired to become a Chakravartin (a universal ruler). The Ashvamedha performances by the Nagas, whom he defeated, may have influenced him as well. His southern expedition may have been motivated by economic considerations of controlling the trade between India and Southeast Asia.

=== Early victories ===
The early portion of the Allahabad Pillar inscription mentions that Samudragupta "uprooted" Achyuta, Nagasena, and a ruler whose name is lost in the damaged portion of the inscription. The third name ends in "-ga", and is generally restored as Ganapati-naga, because Achyuta-nandin (presumably same as Achyuta), Nagasena, and Ganapati-naga are once again mentioned in the later part of the inscription, among the kings of Aryavarta (northern India) defeated by Samudragupta. These kings are identified as the rulers of present-day western Uttar Pradesh (see below). According to the inscription, Samudragupta reinstated these rulers after they sought his forgiveness.

It is not clear why the names of these three kings is repeated later in the inscription. According to one theory, these three kings were vassal rulers who rebelled against Samudragupta after the death of his father. Samudragupta crushed the rebellion, and reinstated them after they sought his forgiveness. Later, these rulers rebelled once more, and Samudragupta defeated them again. Another possibility is that the author of the inscription thought it necessary to repeat these names while describing Samudragupta's later conquests in Aryavarta, simply because these kings belonged to that region.

Samudragupta dispatched an army to capture the scion of the Kota family, whose identity is uncertain. The Kotas may have been the rulers of present-day Punjab, where coins bearing the legend "Kota", and featuring a symbol of Shiva and his bull, have been discovered.

The inscription states that the Gupta army captured the Kota ruler, while Samudragupta himself "played" (or pleased himself) in a city called Pushpa (the name Pushpa-pura referred to Pataliputra at Samudragupta's time, although it came to be used for Kanyakubja in the later period). Modern scholars have interpreted the word "played" in various ways: According to one theory, this portion describes Samudragupta's achievements as a prince. An alternative interpretation is that Samudragupta dispatched his army on these campaigns, while he himself stayed at the capital. It is also possible that the poet intended to convey that these campaigns were minor affairs that did not require the king's direct involvement at the battlefront.

=== Southern conquests ===
According to the Allahabad Pillar inscription, Samudragupta captured (and later released) the following kings of Dakshinapatha, the southern region:

1. Mahendra of Kosala
2. Vyaghra-raja of Mahakantara
3. Mantaraja of Kurala
4. Mahendragiri of Pishtapura
5. Svamidatta of Kottura
6. Damana of Erandapalla
7. Vishnugopa of Kanchi
8. Nilaraja of Avamukta
9. Hastivarman of Vengi
10. Ugrasena of Palakka
11. Kubera of Devarashtra
12. Dhananjaya of Kusthalapura

The exact identification of several of these kings is debated among modern scholars, but it is clear that these kings ruled areas located on the eastern coast of India. Samudragupta most probably passed through the forest tract of central India, reached the eastern coast in present-day Odisha, and then marched south along the coast of Bay of Bengal.

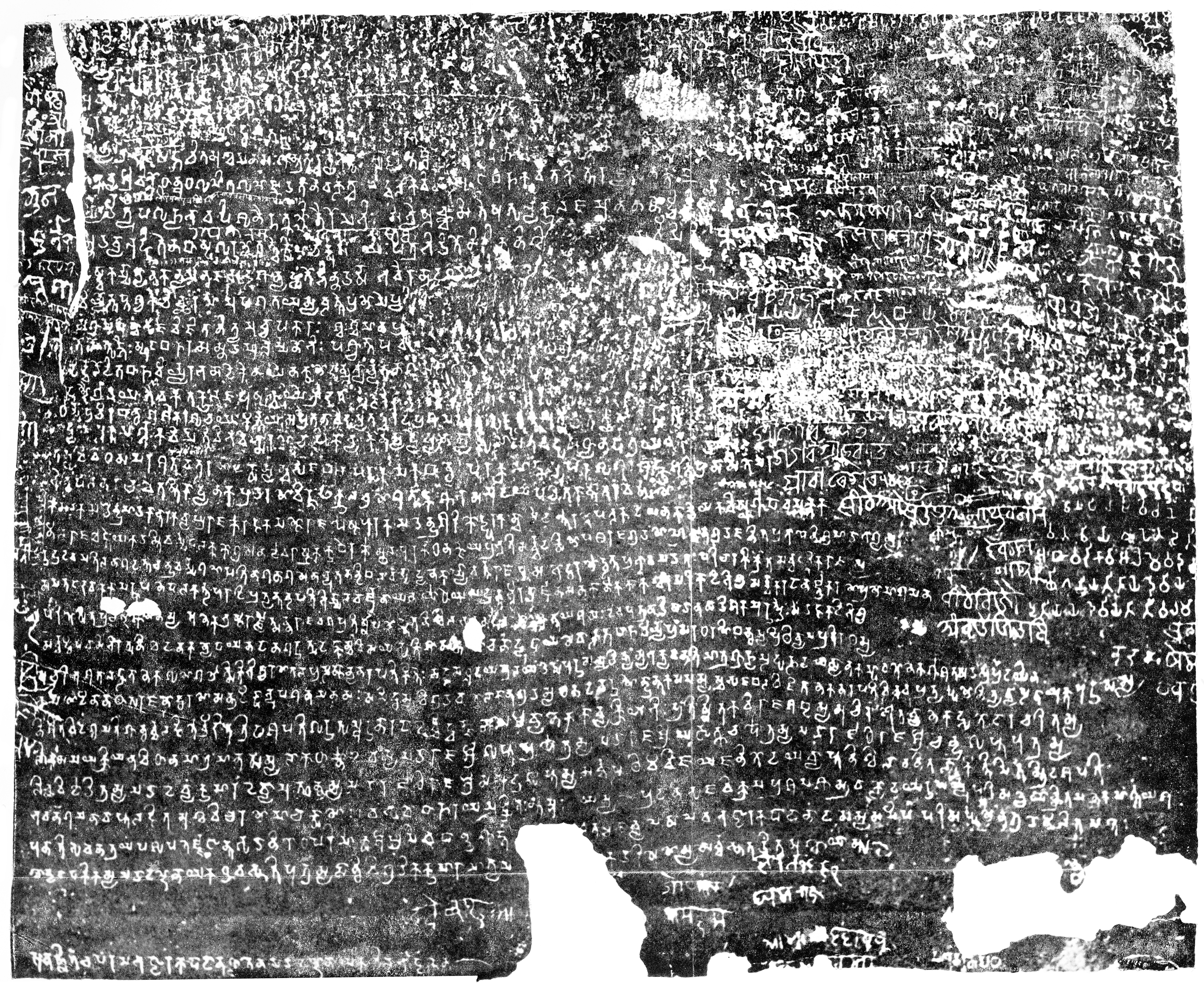
Text of the Allahabad stone pillar inscription of Samudragupta, in the Brahmi script.

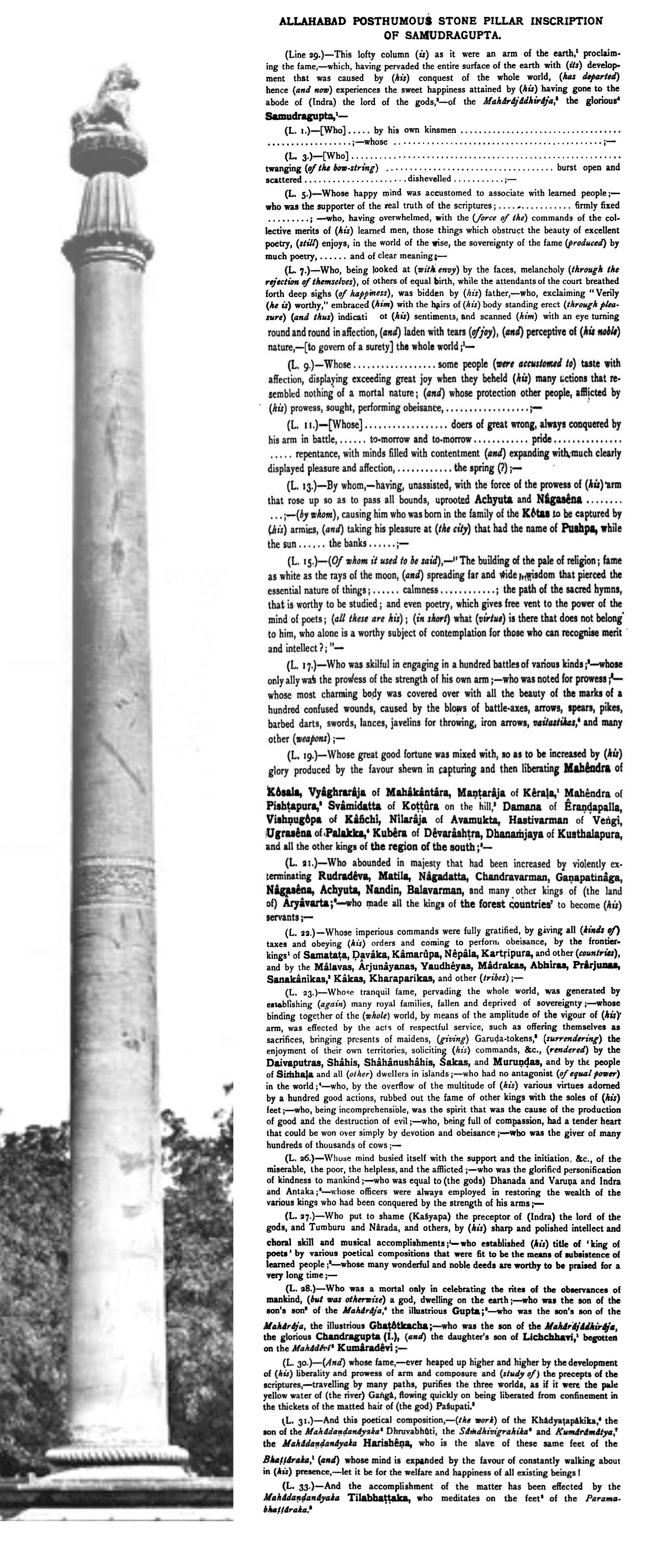
Translation of the Allahabad inscription of Samudragupta

The inscription states that Samudragupta later released these kings, and favoured (anugraha) them. Most modern scholars theorize that Samudragupta reinstated these rulers as his tributaries. M. G. S. Narayanan interprets the word anugraha differently based on its occurrence in the Arthashastra; he theorizes that Samudragupta gave "protection and aid" to these kingdoms in order to secure their alliances.

Some scholars, such as J. Dubreuil and B. V. Krishnarao, theorized that Samudragupta only advanced up to the Krishna River, and was forced to retreat without fighting a battle, when the southern kings formed a strong confederacy to oppose him. According to these scholars, the claim that Samudragupta released these kings is an attempt by Samudragupta's courtier to cover up the emperor's failure. However, there is no evidence of the southern kings forming a confederacy against Samudragupta. Historian Ashvini Agrawal notes that setting free a captured king is inline with the ancient Indian political ideals. For example, Kautilya defines three types of conquerors: the righteous conqueror (dharma-vijayi), who restores the defeated king in exchange for his acknowledgment of the conqueror's suzerainty; the covetous conqueror (lobha-vijayi), who takes away the possessions of the defeated king but spares his life; and the demoniac conqueror (asura-vijayi), who annexes the territory of the defeated king and kills him. Such political ideals existed in the Gupta period too, as evident from Kalidasa's statement in Raghuvamsha that "the righteous victorious monarch (Raghu) only took away the royal glory of the lord of Mahendra who had been captured and released, but not his kingdom." Therefore, it is likely that Samudragupta acted like a righteous conqueror, and restored the defeated kings as his vassals.

Mahendra of Kosala
Kosala here refers to Dakshina Kosala, which includes parts of present-day Chhattisgarh and Odisha. One theory identifies Mahendra of Kosala with a Nala king named Mahendraditya.

Vyaghra-raja of Mahakantara
Historian K. P. Jayaswal identifies Mahakantara (literally "great wilderness") as the Bastar-Kanker area in present-day Chhattisgarh. According to another theory, Mahakantara is same as Mahavana, a synonym used as the name for the forest region around present-day Jeypore of Odisha.
Earlier historians identified Mahakantara as a region in central India, and identified Vyaghra-raja with the Vakataka feudatory Vyaghra-deva, whose inscriptions have been found at Nachna. However, this identification is now considered incorrect, as Samudragupta is not known to have fought against the Vakatakas.

Mantaraja of Kurala
The Rawan inscription of the Sharabhapuriya king Narendra, who ruled in the Dakshina Kosala region, mentions an area called Mantaraja-bhukti ("the province of Mantaraja"). Therefore, some historians such as K. D. Bajpai theorize that Mantaraja was a king who ruled in the Dakshina Kosala region. Historian A. M. Shastri disputes this theory, arguing that the ruler of Kosala (that is, Dakshina Kosala) has been mentioned separately in the Allahabad Pillar inscription.
Lorenz Franz Kielhorn speculated that Kurala was same as Kaurala (or Kunala) mentioned in the Aihole inscription of the 7th century king Pulakeshin II, and identified it as the area around the Kolleru Lake in present-day Andhra Pradesh. H. C. Raychaudhuri disputes this identification, pointing out that this region was a part of Hastivarman's Vengi kingdom, which has been mentioned separately in the Allahabad Pillar inscription.
Other proposed identifications of Kurala include Kolada near Bhanjanagar (former Russelkonda) in Odisha; and Kulula, a region mentioned in the Mahendragiri inscription of the 11th century king Rajendra Chola, and identified with Cherla in present-day Telangana.

Mahendragiri of Pishtapura
Pishtapura is modern Pithapuram in Andhra Pradesh. The word giri mentions hill in Sanskrit, and therefore, J. F. Fleet speculated that "Mahendragiri" could not have been a person's name: he suggested that the verse (Mahendragiri-Kautturaka-Svamidatta) referred to a king called "Mahendra", and a place called "Kottura on the hill" which was ruled by Svamidatta. However, Fleet's translation is incorrect: the verse clearly mentions Mahendragiri of Pishtapura and Svamidatta of Kottura as two distinct persons. G. Ramdas interpreted the verse to mean Svamidatta was the ruler of Pishtapura and "Kottura near Mahendragiri", while Bhau Daji translated it as "Svamidatta of Pishtapura, Mahendragiri and Kottura". However, these translations are also incorrect. The concern about the king's name is invalid: several historical records mention names ending in the word giri or its synonym adri.

Svamidatta of Kottura
Svamidatta was probably one of the chiefs who resisted Samudragupta's passage through the Kalinga region. Kottura has been identified with modern Kotturu (or Kothur) in Srikakulam district, Andhra Pradesh (near Paralakhemundi, Odisha). Alternative proposals identify it with other similarly named places in present-day Andhra Pradesh.

Damana of Erandapalla
Proposed identifications of Erandapalla include Errandapali near Srikakulam, a town near Mukhalingam, Yendipalli in Visakhapatnam district, and Endipalli in West Godavari district.

Vishnugopa of Kanchi
Vishnugopa is identified as the Pallava ruler of Kanchipuram: Samudragupta's invasion probably occurred when he acted as a regent for his nephew Skandavarman III.

Nilaraja of Avamukta
The identity of Avamukta is uncertain. The Brahmanda Purana mentions an area called "Avimukta-kshetra", located on the banks of the Gautami river (that is, Godavari), which may be identified with Avamukta of Samudragupta's inscription. Some historical texts use the name Avamukta-kshetra for the region around Varanasi, but Varanasi is not located in Dakshinapatha, and therefore, was certainly not the Avamukta mentioned in the inscription.

Hastivarman of Vengi
Hastivarman was the Shalankayana king of Vengi (modern Pedavegi) in Andhra Pradesh.

Ugrasena of Palakka
J. Dubreuil identified Palakka with the place referred to as Palakkada in several Pallava inscriptions; this location was probably the headquarters of a Pallava viceroyalty. For example, the Uruvapalli grant inscription of Yuva-maharaja (Prince) Vishnugopa-varman was issued from Palakkada.
G. Ramdas identified it with Pakkai located between Udayagiri and Venkatagiri in the Nellore district, and theorized that it was same as the place referred to as Paka-nadu, Panka-nadu, or Pakai-nadu in the inscriptions of the 10th century Chola king Rajaraja I.

Kubera of Devarashtra
According to one theory, Deva-rashtra was located in the historical Kalinga region of present-day northern Andhra Pradesh. The Srungavarapukota inscription of the Vasishtha king Anantavarman, issued from Pishtapura in this area, describes his grandfather Gunavarman as Deva-rashtradhipati ("Lord of Deva-rashtra"). The Kasimkota inscription of the 10th century Vengi Chalukya king Bhima I mentions a vishaya (district) called Deva-rashtra in Kalinga. Based on this, J. Dubreuil identified Devarashtra as a location in the present-day Yelamanchili taluka of Andhra Pradesh. During Samudragupta's period, the Kalinga region appears to have been divided among several small kingdoms, which may have included Kottura, Pishtapura, and Devarashtra.

Dhananjaya of Kusthalapura
B. V. Krishnarao speculated that Dhananjaya of Samudragupta's inscription may be same as the Dhananjaya from whom the chieftains of Dhanyakataka (modern Dharanikota in Andhra Pradesh) claimed descent. He identified Kusthalapura with modern Kolanupaka (or Kollipak) located on the banks of the Aleru River in present-day Telangana. Another theory identifies Kusthalapura with a tract around the Kushasthali River near Dakshina Kosala.

=== Northern conquests ===
According to the Allahabad Pillar inscription, Samudragupta "forcibly uprooted" the following kings of Aryavarta, the northern region:

1. Rudradeva
2. Matila
3. Nagadatta
4. Chandravarman
5. Ganapatinaga
6. Nagasena
7. Achyuta-nandin
8. Balavarman

Unlike the southern kings, the inscription does not mention the territories ruled by these kings, which suggests that their kingdoms were annexed to the Gupta empire. The inscription also mentions that Samudragupta defeated some other kings, but does not mention their names, presumably because the poet saw them as unimportant.

Rudradeva
Rudradeva may be same as a king named Rudra, whose coin has been found at Kaushambi. Another theory identifies Rudradeva with a Western Kshatrapa (Shaka) king of Ujjain, either Rudradaman II or Rudrasena III.
Some earlier scholars, such as K. N. Dikshit and K. P. Jayaswal, identified Rudradeva with the Vakataka king Rudrasena I. However, this identification seems to be inaccurate, because Samudragupta's inscription explicitly mentions Rudradeva as a king of the northern region (Aryavarta), while the Vakatakas ruled in the southern region (Dakshinapatha). An argument cited in support of this identification is that Rudrasena bore the title Maharaja ("great king") as opposed to samrat ("emperor"), signifying his subordinate status to Samudragupta. However, multiple sovereign Vakataka kings bore the title Maharaja: only Pravarasena I assumed the title samrat after performing a vajapeya ritual sacrifice. An inscription of Rudrasena's descendant Prithvishena II mentions that the Vakataka kingdom had been prospering for a hundred years, suggesting that the Vakataka rule remained uninterrupted during Rudrasena's reign.

Matila
The identity of Matila is not certain. Earlier, Matila was identified with Mattila, who is known from a terracotta seal discovered at Bulandshahr. However, there is no evidence that this Mattila was a ruler, and epigraphist Jagannath Agrawal has dated the seal to the 6th century on palaeographic basis.

Nagadatta
Nagadatta is not known from any other inscriptions or coins, but his name has led to suggestions that he may have been the ruler of a Naga branch. D. C. Sircar theorized that he was an ancestor of a family of Gupta viceroys, whose names ended in -datta. Tej Ram Sharma speculates that he may have been a Naga ruler, whose successors were sent as Gupta viceroys in Bengal after the family accepted the Gupta suzerainty.

Chandravarman
Chandravarman of Samudragupta's inscription has been identified with Chandravarman, the ruler of Pushkarana (modern Pakhanna) in present-day West Bengal. P. L. Gupta and some earlier scholars have identified this ruler with another Chandravarman, who has been mentioned in an inscription discovered at Mandsaur in present-day Madhya Pradesh. Tej Ram Sharma disputes this identification, arguing that Samudragupta "exterminated" all kings of Aryavarta and annexed their territories, as suggested by the Allahabad Pillar inscription; however, Naravarman – a brother of Chandravarman of Mandsaur – is known to have been ruling as a feudatory in 404 CE.

Ganapatinaga
Ganapati-naga is identified as a Naga king. Several coins bearing the legend Ganapati have been discovered at Padmavati, Vidisha, and Mathura. Although these coins do not bear the suffix "naga", they are similar to the ones issued by the other Naga kings such as Skanda-naga, Brihaspati-naga, and Deva-naga. Since hundreds of Ganapati's coins have been found at Mathura, it appears that he was the ruler of a Naga branch headquartered at Mathura.

Nagasena
The 7th century text Harshacharita refers to the Naga king Nagasena, who "met with his doom in Padmavati, as his secret plan was divulged by a sarika bird". Assuming this describes a historical person, it appears that Nagasena was the ruler of a Naga branch headquartered at Padmavati in present-day Madhya Pradesh.

Achyuta-nandin
Achyuta-nandin seems to be same as Achyuta, who is mentioned earlier in the inscription; his name may have been shortened in the earlier verses for metrical purposes. An alternatively theory identifies Achyuta and Nandin as two distinct kings.
Achyuta was the ruler of Ahichchhatra in present-day Uttar Pradesh, where coins attributed to him have been discovered. These coins bear the legend "Achyu", and are similar to the coins issued by the Naga rulers. This has led to suggestions that the Achyuta-nandin defeated by Samudragupta was the ruler of a Naga branch headquartered at Ahichhatra.

Balavarman
V. V. Mirashi identified Bala-varman (or Balavarma) as a ruler of the Magha dynasty of Kosambi. U. N. Roy suggested that Bala-varman may have been an ancestor of the Maukhari kings, who initially served as Gupta vassals, and whose names ended in -varman. Another theory identifies him with the successor of Shridhara-varman, the Shaka ruler of Eran. Samudragupta may have ended the dynasty of Eran, as suggested by the discovery of his inscription at Eran.
K. N. Dikshit identified Balavarman with Balavarman, a ruler of the Varman dynasty of Kamarupa; however, Balavarman was not a contemporary of Samudragupta. Moreover, Kamarupa has been mentioned as a distinct frontier kingdom later on in the Allahabad Pillar inscription.

=== Conquests in the forest region ===
According to the Allahabad Pillar inscription, Samudragupta reduced all the kings of the forest region (atavika) to subservience. This forest region may have been located in central India: the inscriptions of the Parivrajaka dynasty, which ruled in this area, state that their ancestral kingdom was located within the 18 forest kingdoms.

=== Frontier kings and tribes ===
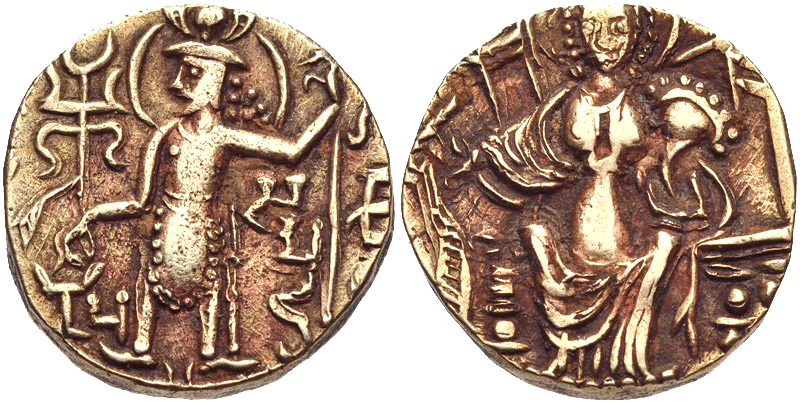
Coin minted in the Punjab area with the name "Samudra" ( Sa-mu-dra), derived from the style of late Kushan Empire coinage, and tamgha. These atypical coins follow the fall of the last Kushan ruler Kipunada, and just precede the coinage of the first Kidarite Huns in northwestern India. Circa CE 350–375.

The Allahabad Pillar inscription mentions that rulers of several frontier kingdoms and tribal oligarchies paid Samudragupta tributes, obeyed his orders, and performed obeisance before him. The inscription explicitly describes the five kingdoms as frontier territories: the areas controlled by the tribes were also probably located at the frontier of Samudrgupta's kingdom.

"Samudragupta, whose formidable rule was propitiated with the payment of all tributes, execution of orders and visits (to his court) for obeisance by such frontier rulers as those of Samataṭa, Ḍavāka, Kāmarūpa, Nēpāla, and Kartṛipura, and, by the Mālavas, Ārjunāyanas, Yaudhēyas, Mādrakas, Ābhīras, Prārjunas, Sanakānīkas, Kākas, Kharaparikas and other nations."

— Lines 22–23 of the Allahabad pillar inscription of Samudragupta (r.c.350–375 CE).

Historian Upinder Singh theorizes that the relationship of these frontier rulers to the Gupta emperor had "certain elements of a feudatory relationship". According to historian R. C. Majumdar, it is likely that Samudragupta's conquests in Aryavarta and Dakshinapatha increased his reputation to such an extent that the frontier rulers and tribes submitted him without a fight.

The frontier kingdoms included:

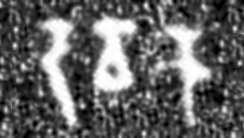
"Davaka" (Brahmi script:) in the Allahabad Pillar inscription

1. Samatata, located in the present-day Bengal.
2. Davaka, located in present-day Assam.
3. Kamarupa, located in present-day Assam.
4. Nepala, located in present-day Nepal. According to one theory, Nepala here refers to the Licchavi kingdom, whose rulers may have been the maternal relatives of Samudragupta.
5. Karttripura, probably located in the present-day Uttarakhand: the inscription appears to name frontier kingdoms in geographical order proceeding from Bengal to Assam to Nepal; Uttarakhand would be next in the sequence. A now-obsolete theory identified Karttripura with Kartarpur in present-day Punjab, but Kartarpur was established much later, in the 16th century, by Guru Arjan.

The tribal oligarchies included:

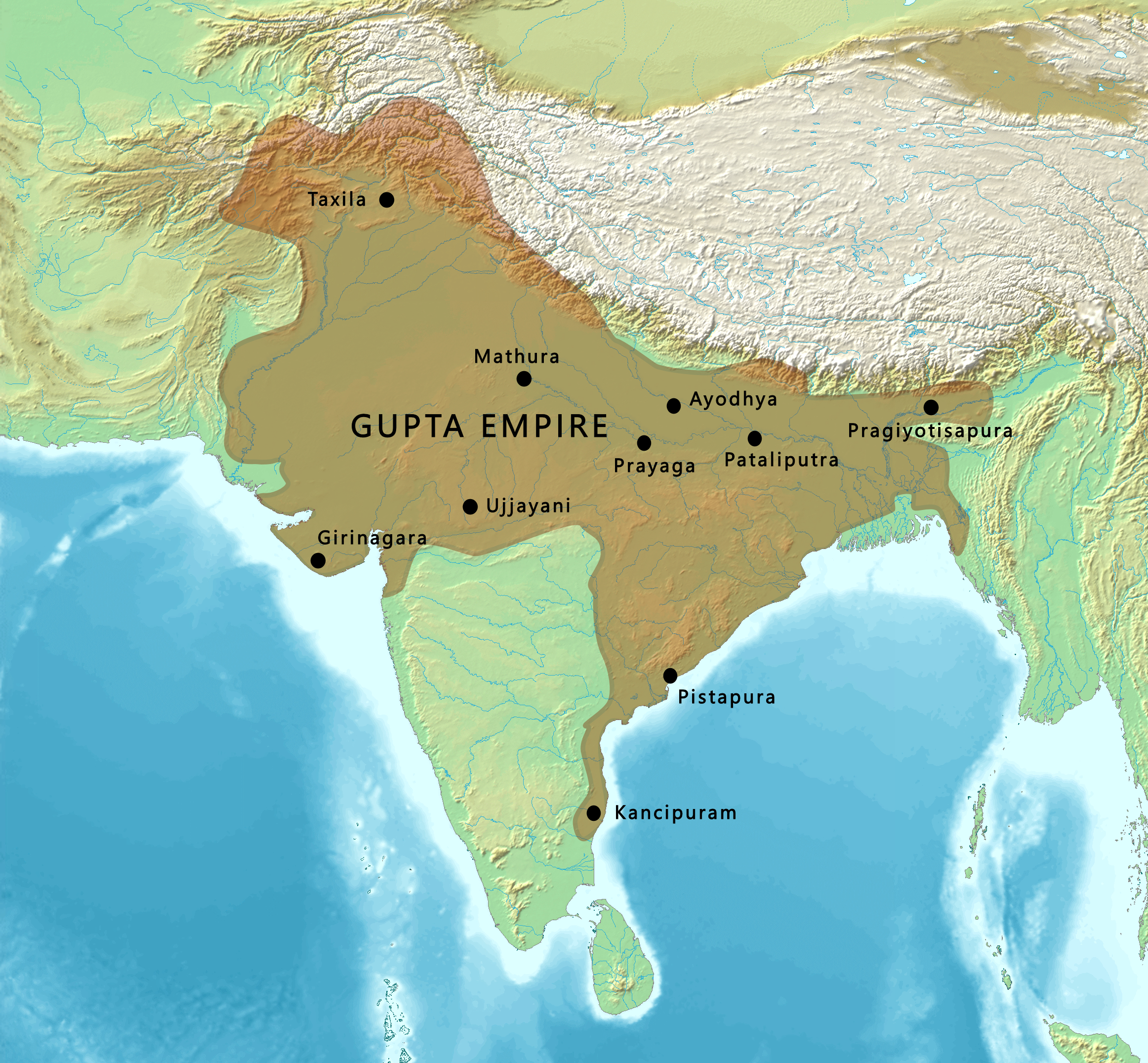
Map of the Gupta Empire c. 420 CE, according to Joseph E. Schwartzberg, with contemporary polities
1. Malavas: During Samudragupta's period, they were probably headquartered at Karkota-nagara (present-day Nagar Fort in Rajasthan), where several thousands of their coins have been discovered.
2. Arjunayanas: Their coins have been found in the Mathura region. According to numismatist John Allan, the Arjunayanas resided in the triangle connecting the present-day Delhi, Jaipur and Agra.
3. Yaudheyas: They ruled the area between the Sutlej and the Yamuna rivers after the Kushans. They seem to have become Samudragupta's tributaries.
4. Madrakas: They are generally placed between the Ravi and the Chenab rivers.
5. Abhiras: Epigraphic and literary evidence suggests that they ruled in western India during Samudragupta's period. Historian Bhagwan Singh Suryavanshi argued that the Abhiras mentioned among the tributary peoples in Samudragupta's Allahabad Pillar inscription were not the monarchical Abhiras of Khandesh. According to Suryavanshi, Samudragupta's Dakshinapatha campaign did not involve a conflict with the Khandesh Abhira polity, and the tribute-paying Abhiras were more likely a republican Abhira group located near the Madrakas in the Kangra–Chamba region.
1. Sanakanikas: They appear to have ruled the region around Udayagiri in present-day Madhya Pradesh. An inscription found at Udayagiri refers to a Sanakanika chief as a feudatory of Chandragupta II: this chief and his two predecessors are described as "Maharajas", which suggests that Samudragupta allowed the Sanakanika chiefs to rule as his governors after conquering their territory.
2. Kakas: They may have been the rulers of the area around the Sanchi hill, which has been mentioned as Kakanada in ancient inscriptions.
3. Prarjunas They may be identified as the Prarjunakas mentioned in the Arthashastra, but their location is uncertain. Various theories place them in central India, including around the present-day Narsinghpur or Narsinghgarh in Madhya Pradesh.
4. Kharaparikas: They may be same as the "Kharaparas" (literally "thief" or "rogue") mentioned in a 14th-century stone inscription found at Batiyagarh (or Battisgarh) in Damoh district. These Kharaparas are variously identified as an indigenous tribe or freebooters of this region.
  - Some later sources suggest that the Kharaparas were a foreign tribe (possibly Mongols), and the Dingal-language texts use the word "Kharapara" as a synonym for "Muslim", but such an identification is not applicable to Samudragupta's period.
  - There is also some speculation about the Kharaparikas being same as the Gardabhilas mentioned in the Puranas, as the words "Khara" and "Gardabha" both mean "donkey" in Sanskrit. However, very little is known about the Gardabhilas from historical sources.

=== Relations with other rulers ===
Samudragupta's inscription mentions that several kings tried to please him by attending on him personally; offering him their daughters in marriage (or, according to another interpretation, gifting him maidens); and seeking the use of the Garuda-depicting Gupta seal for administering their own territories. These kings included "Daivaputra-Shahi-Shahanushahi, Shaka-Murundas, and the rulers of the island countries such as Simhala".

==== Daivaputra-Shahi-Shahanushahi ====
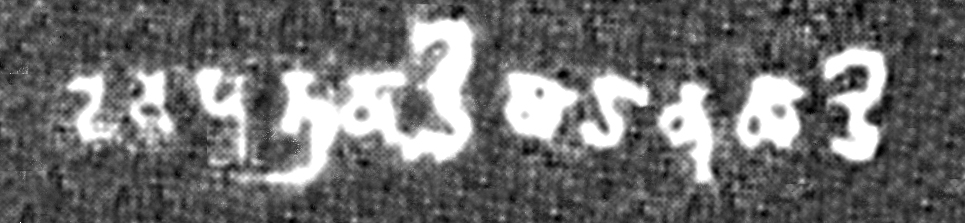
The expression Devaputra Shāhi Shāhānu Shāhi in Middle Brahmi in the Allahabad pillar (Line 23).

Numismatist John Allan theorized that Daivaputra, Shahi, and Shahanushahi were three different states; or alternatively, Shahi-Shahanushahi was a single state. Historian D. R. Bhandarkar argued that Daivaputra ("a descendant of Devaputra") cannot be a stand-alone name, and identified Daivaputra-Shahi-Shahanushahi as a single ruler, possibly Kidara I, who had established a new kingdom Gandhara (present-day Afghanistan).

According to historian Tej Ram Sharma, Daivaputra refers to a Kushan king (Devaputra being a Kushan title); Shahi refers to a sub-branch of the Kushans; and Shahanushahi refers to the Sasanians. These kings controlled parts of present-day Punjab and Afghanistan.

Historian Ashvini Agrwal theorizes that Kidara, who initially ruled as a vassal of the Sasanian king Shapur II, may have formed an alliance with Samudragupta to overthrow his Sasanian overlord. In Raghuvamsha, the Gupta court poet Kalidasa states his hero Raghu defeated the Parasikas (Persians): Agrwal speculates that this description may be inspired from the Kidraite-Gupta victory over the Sasanians.

According to Abraham Eraly and others, the expression Devaputra Shāhi Shāhānu Shāhi evidently designates the Kushan princes, being a deformation of the Kushan regnal titles Devaputra, Shao and Shaonanoshao: "Son of God, King, King of Kings". This suggests that by the time of the Allahabad inscription the Kushans still ruled in Punjab, but under the suzerainty of the Gupta Emperor.

According to Hans T. Bakker, candidates for the Daivaputrasāhi are the late Kushan kings of Gandhāra: Vasudeva II or Kipunadha, and regarding the śaka-murunda I follow Konow and Lüders, who argue that this 'passage in the Allahabad inscription of Samudragupta leaves no doubt that murunda (i.e. 'commander'), originally was a title used by Saka princes'. The șāhānuṣāhi refers to the 'king of kings' Shapur II.

According to S.R. Goyal, Samudragupta was determined to ensure the safety of the empire's frontiers and secure the western trade routes. To address these concerns, he formed an alliance with Kidara, a strategic move aimed at countering the threats posed by Shapur II of the Sassanian Empire. As the more powerful partner in this alliance, Samudragupta provided significant support to Kidara. This collaboration proved to be highly effective; Kidara achieved victories over the Sassanians in 367-368 AD. However, these victories did not necessarily result in Shapur II becoming a vassal of either Kidara or Samudragupta.

==== Shaka-Murundas ====
Some scholars believe that the term "Shaka-Murundas" refers to a single entity. For example, scholars such as Sten Konow assert that "Murunda" is a Shaka title meaning "lord"; the Kushans also used similar titles (for example, Kanishka is titled a "muroda" in his Zeda inscription).

Other scholars, such as K. P. Jayaswal, believe that Shakas and Murundas are two different groups of people. According to this theory, Shakas here most probably refers to the Western Kshatrapa rulers of Ujjain. Jayaswal notes that the Puranas mention the rule of 13 Murunda kings, and Hemachandra's Abhidhana-Chintamani describes Murunda as people of Lampaka (in present-day Afghanistan). However, Agrwal points out that these sources are of relatively late origin, and it is possible that a branch of the Shakas had come to be known as "Murundas".

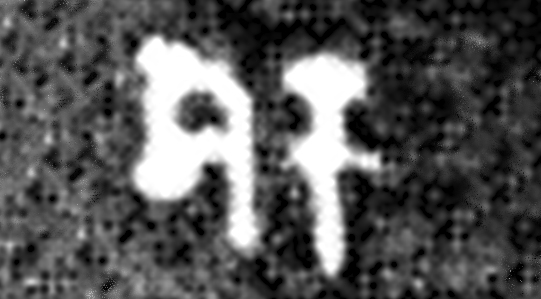
The vanquished "Śaka" mentioned by Samudragupta in the Allahabad pillar (Line 23) probably refer to the Saka ruler Sridharavarman in Central India.

The exact location of the Shakas mentioned in Samudragupta's inscription is not certain. V. A. Smith identified them with the Western Kshatrapas, who controlled the western Malwa and Saurashtra regions. D. R. Bhandarkar alternatively identified the Shaka-Murunda ruler with Shridhara-varman, a Shaka ruler whose inscriptions have been discovered at Sanchi (Kanakerha inscription) and Eran. Eran then came under the direct control of Samudragupta, as attested by his Eran inscription.

==== Simhala and other islands ====
According to the Chinese sources, Meghavarna, the king of Simhala (present-day Sri Lanka), sought to build a monastery at Bodh Gaya, for the convenience of the pilgrims from his kingdom. He sent rich presents for this purpose, and Samudragupta sanctioned his request to build the monastery. Using poetic exaggeration, Samudragupta's courtier Harishena appears to have described this act of diplomacy as an act of subservience. Similarly, the 7th-century Chinese traveler Xuanzang, who visited this monastery, appears to have regarded the rich presents sent by Meghavarna as tribute: he states that Meghavarna "gave in tribute to the king of India all the jewels of his country".

The "other islands" may be the Indianized kingdoms of South-East Asia, but there is no evidence that their rulers were subordinate to Samudragupta. They probably sent embassies to the Gupta empire, and maintained friendly relations. The sea ports of the Gupta Empire, such as Tamralipti, were probably connected to these kingdoms through the marine routes. The widespread use of Sanskrit in these kingdoms may have happened as a result of Gupta influence.

== Imperial extent ==
Samudragupta's empire included a core territory, located in northern India, which was directly controlled by the emperor. Besides, it comprised a number of monarchical and tribal tributary states. Historian R. C. Majumdar theorizes that Samudragupta directly controlled an area extending from the Ravi River (Punjab) in the west to the Brahmaputra River (Bengal and Assam) in the east, and from the Himalayan foothills in the north to the Vindhya hills in the south. The south-western boundary of his territory roughly followed an imaginary line drawn from present-day Karnal to Bhilsa.

In the south, Samudragupta's empire definitely included Eran in present-day Madhya Pradesh, where his inscription has been found. The Allahabad Pillar inscription suggests that he advanced up to Kanchipuram in the south. However, since the claims in the Allahabad Pillar inscription are from a royal eulogy, they must be treated with caution. The southern kings were not under his direct suzerainty: they only paid him tribute.

According to historian Kunal Chakrabarti, Samudragupta's military campaigns weakened the tribal republics of present-day Punjab and Rajasthan, but even these kingdoms were not under his direct suzerainty: they only paid him tribute. Samudragupta's claim of control over other kings is questionable. Historian Ashvini Agrawal notes that a gold coin of the Gadahara tribe bears the legend Samudra, which suggests that Samudragupta's control extended up to the Chenab river in the Punjab region.

Some earlier scholars, such as J. F. Fleet believed that Samudragupta had also conquered a part of Maharashtra, based on the identification of Devarashtra with Maharashtra, and Erandapalla with Erandol, where some Gupta-era remains have been found. However, this theory is no longer considered correct.

== Coinage ==
Imitation of Kushan coinage

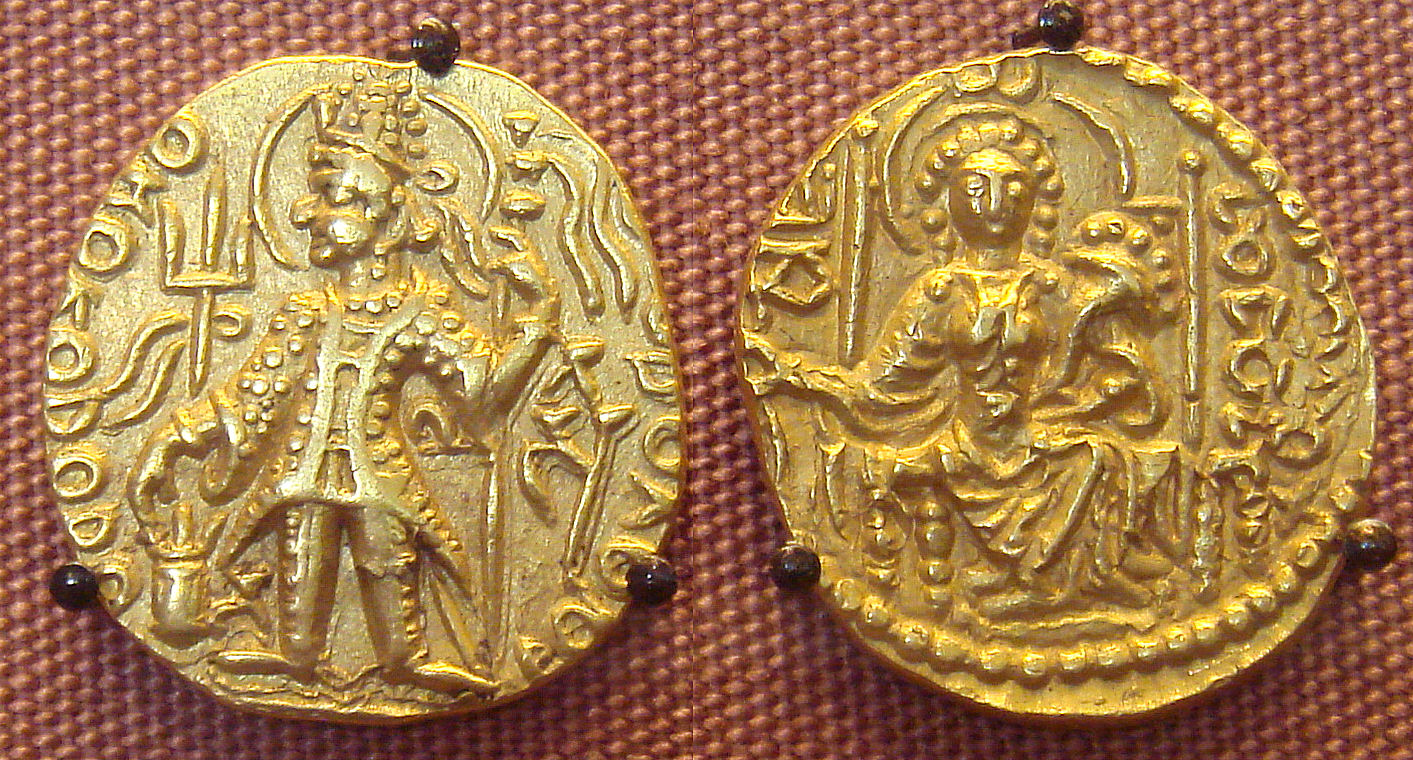
Kushan coin of Vasudeva II, 275–300 CE.

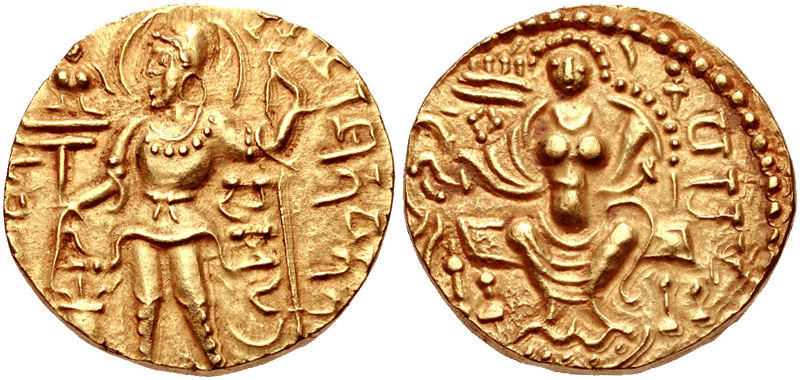
Standard type of Samudragupta, 335/350-375 CE

Samudragupta was the first Gupta ruler to mint coins. These were in imitation of the coinage of the Kushan Empire, adopting its weight standard, techniques and designs, following the conquests of Samudragupta in the northwest. The two types of coins are similar, except for the headdress of the ruler (a close-fitting cap instead of the Kushan pointed hat), the Garuda standard instead of the trident, and Samudragupta's jewelry, which is Indian.

The coinage of the Gupta Empire was initially derived from the coinage of the Kushan Empire, adopting its weight standard, techniques and designs, following the conquests of Samudragupta in the northwest of the subcontinent. The Guptas even adopted from the Kushans the name of Dinara for their coinage, which ultimately came from the Roman name Denarius aureus. The standard coin type of Samudragupta is highly similar to the coinage of the later Kushan rulers, including the sacrificial scene over an altar, the depiction of a halo, while differences include the headdress of the ruler (a close-fitting cap instead of the Kushan pointed hat), the Garuda standard instead of the trident, and Samudragupta's jewelry, which is Indian.

The following types of Samudragupta's coins, inscribed with Sanskrit language legends, have been discovered:

Standard type

- Obverse legend: Samara-shata-vitata-vijayo-jita-ripurajito-divam-jayati. Translation: "The unconquered one who has conquered his enemies [and] has continuously attained victories in a hundred battles, wins heaven"; Alternative translation: "The conqueror of the unconquered fortresses of his enemies, whose victory was spread in hundreds of battles, conquers heaven".
- Reverse legend: Prakramah

Archer type

- Depicts Samudragupta standing fully dressed with a bow on his left hand and an arrow on his right hand.
- Obverse legend: Apratiratha vijitya kshitim sucharitair (or avnipatir) divam Jayati. Translation: "Unopposed by hostile chariots, conquering the earth, he conquers heaven by his good deeds".
- Reverse legend: Apratirathah

Battle-axe type

- Obverse legend: Kritanta-parshur-jayatyajitarajajetaji-tah. Translation: "Wielding the axe of Kritanta (the god of death), the unconquered conqueror of unconquered kings is victorious"
- Reverse legend: Kritanta-parashuh

Tiger-slayer type

- Depicts the king wearing turban and waist-cloth, and trampling a tiger
- Legend: Vaghra-prakramah. Translation: "Having the prowess of a tiger".

Lyrist type

- Depicts Samudragupta wearing waist-cloth and seated cross-legged on a couch, playing a veena that lies on his knees.
- Legend: the king's name

Ashvamedha type

- Obverse legend: Rajadhirajah prithvim avitva divam jayatyahritavaji-medhah ("the overlord of kings, who has performed the horse-sacrifice, having protected the earth, conquers the heaven") on the reverse.
  - Some coins have an alternative legend: Rajadhirajah prithvim avitva divam jayatya-prativarya-viryah ("the overlord of kings, of irresistible valour, having protected the earth, wins heaven").
- Reverse legend: Ashvamedha-prakramah ("possessing the valour to perform the horse-sacrifice")

Various scholars, including numismatist John Allan, consider that the gold coins bearing the portraits of Chandragupta and Kumaradevi were issued by Samudragupta to commemorate his parents, while others have attributed the issue of these coins to Chandragupta himself.

Coins of Samudragupta

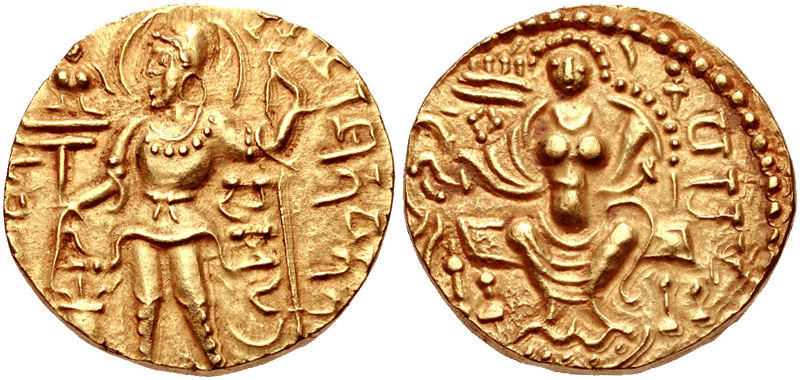
A gold coin of Samudragupta

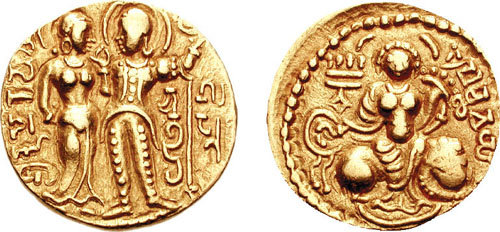
Commemorative type of Chandragupta I: this coin is in the name of Chandragupta I, but since no other coin types of Chandragupta are known, this is thought to be a commemorative issue minted by his son Samudragupta.

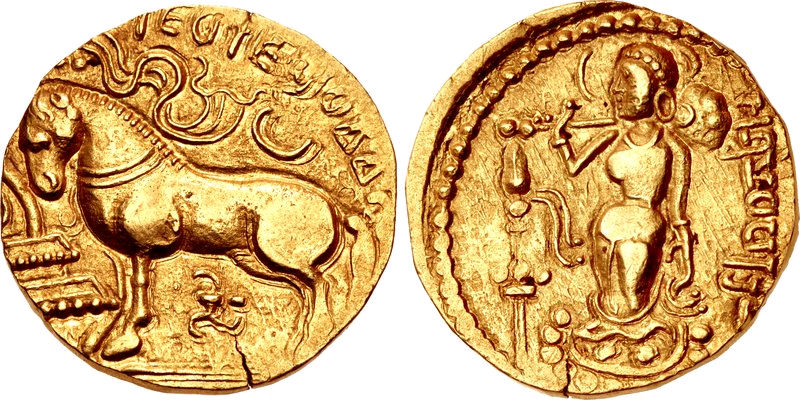
Ashvamedha type coin

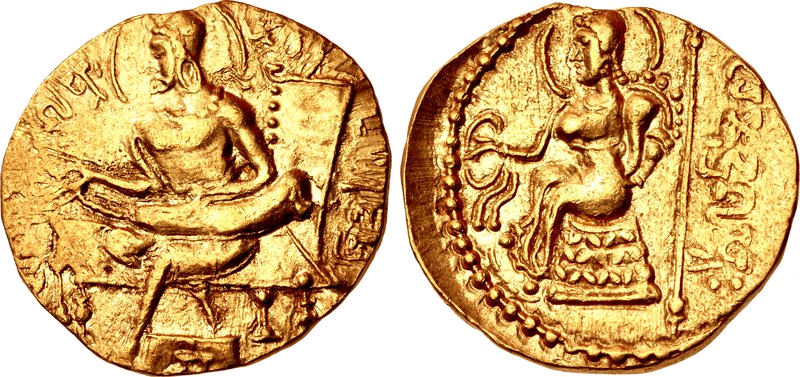
Lyrist type coin

== Inscriptions ==
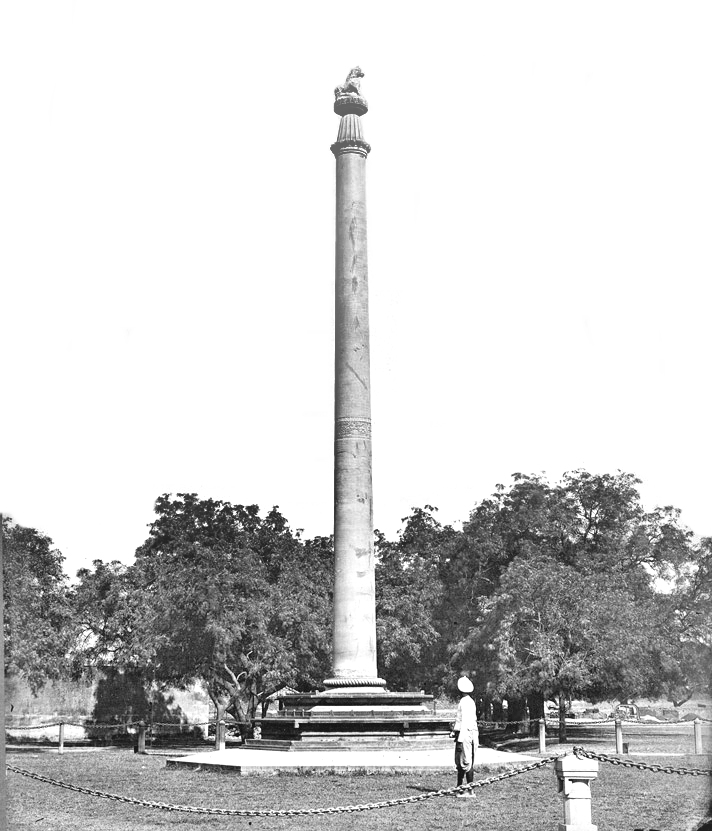
Samudragupta inscriptions on Allahabad pillar.

Two inscriptions from Samudragupta's reign have been discovered:

- Allahabad Pillar inscription
- Eran stone inscription

Fleet theorized that the Allahabad Pillar inscription was posthumous, and was issued during the reign of Chandragupta II, but modern scholars disagree with this theory.

Two other records are attributed to Samudragupta's reign, but the genuineness of these records is disputed:

- Nalanda inscription, dated to the regnal year 5
- Gaya inscription, dated to the regnal year 9

Both these inscriptions state that they were written at the order of the Gupta officer Gopaswamin. Like the Mathura stone inscription of Chandragupta II, these records describe Samudragupta as the "restorer of the Ashvamedha sacrifice". It seems suspicious that records issued so early in Samudragupta's reign mention this claim, which does not appear in the later Allahabad Pillar inscription. One possibility is that these records were issued during Samudragupta's reign, and were damaged after some time, because of which they were restored during the reign of Chandragupta II.

=== Eran inscription ===
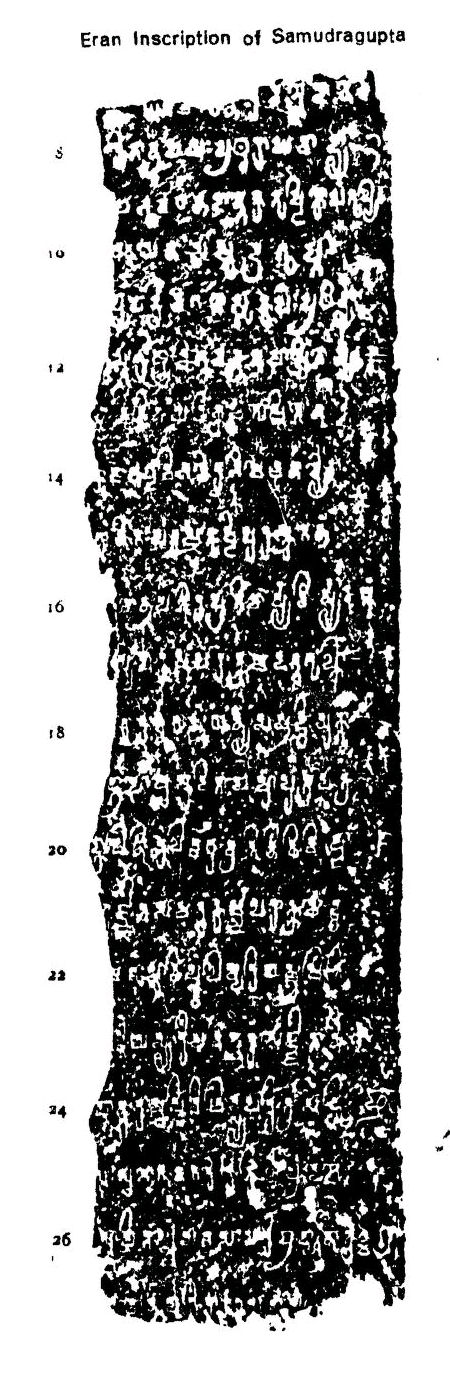
Eran inscription of Samudragupta.

At Eran, an inscription by Samudragupta seems to succeed that of a local Saka ruler named Sridharavarman, already known from the Kanakerha inscription at Sanchi and another inscription in Eran. Samudragupta may therefore have ousted Sridharavarman in his campaigns to the West. The Eran inscription of Samudragupta is presently stored in Kolkata Indian Museum. The inscription, in red sandstone, was found not far to the west of the ruined temple of the boar. It reads:

(Lines 1 to 6, containing the whole of the first verse and the first half of the second, are entirely broken away and lost.)
(Line 7.)— ....................................in giving gold ...................................... [by whom] Prithu and Râghava and other kings [were outshone.]
(L. 9.)— . . . . . . . . . there was Samudragupta, equal to (the gods) Dhanada and Antaka in (respectively) pleasure and anger; . . . . . . . . . . . . . . . . . by policy; (and) [by whom] the whole tribe of kings upon the earth was [overthrown] and reduced to the loss of the wealth of their sovereignty;—
(L. 13.)— [Who], by . . . . . . . . . satisfied by devotion and policy and valour,—by the glories, consisting of the consecration by besprinkling, &c., that belong to the title of 'king,'— (and) by . . . . . . . . . . . combined with supreme satisfaction, — .................. (was) a king whose vigour could not be resisted;—
(L. 17.)— [By whom] there was married a virtuous and faithful wife, whose dower was provided by (his) manliness and prowess; who was possessed of an abundance of [elephants] and horses and money and grain; who delighted in the houses of .............; (and) who went about in the company of many sons and sons' sons;—
(L. 21.)— Whose deeds in battle (are) kindled with prowess; (whose) . . . . . . very mighty fame is always circling round about; and whose enemies are terrified, when they think, even in the intervals of dreaming, of (his). . . . . . . that are vigorous in war; —
(L. 25.) . . . . . . . . . . . . . . . . . . . . in a place in Airikina (Eran), the city of his own enjoyment. . . . . . . . . . . . . has been set up, for the sake of augmenting his own fame.
(L. 27.) — . . . . . . . . . . . . . . . . . . . . . . . . . when the king said . . . . . . .

(The rest of the inscription is entirely broken away and lost.)

— Eran inscription of Samudragupta

== Religion ==
Samudragputa's Eran inscription records the installation of a Vishnu idol in a temple. The Nalanda and Gaya inscriptions attributed to Samudragupta explicitly call him a devotee of Vishnu (parama-Bhagavata) He was also tolerant towards Buddhism, and permitted the construction of a Buddhist monastery commissioned by the Anuradhapura king Meghavarna at Bodh Gaya in his territory.

The Allahabad Pillar inscription states that Samudragupta was engaged in the performance of the Brahmanical ceremonies of Sattra (Soma sacrifices) and Diksha. It describes him as "the giver of many hundreds of thousands of cows". The Mathura stone inscription of his son Chandragupta II also describes him as the giver of "millions of cows and gold". It appears that Samudragupta donated these cows to the Brahmins who officiated his Sattra and Diksha ceremonies. The Eran inscription states that Samudragupta surpassed Prithu, Raghava and other legendary kings in giving gold.

The Allahabad Pillar inscription alludes to his divine kingship, comparing him to the Parama Purusha (supreme being), and also with deities such as Dhanada (Kubera), Varuna, Indra, and Antaka (Yama). The Eran inscription states that he was equal to Kubera and Yama in pleasure and anger respectively. The Mathura stone inscription similarly describes him as equal to the deities Kubera, Varuna, Indra, and Yama.

=== Ashvamedha ===
Samudragupta performed the Ashvamedha ritual, which was used by the ancient Indian kings to prove their imperial sovereignty, and issued gold coins (see Coinage section) to mark this performance. The copper-plate inscriptions of Samudragupta's granddaughter Prabhavati-Gupta, who was a Vakataka queen, describe him as the performer of multiple horse sacrifices. According to one theory, Samudragupta indeed performed more than one horse sacrifices, as attested by the presence of two different legends on his Ashvamedha coins. Another theory dismisses the claim on Prabhavati-Gupta's inscriptions as an exaggeration or a scribal error since this claim does not appear on the inscriptions of Samudragupta or his successors.

The Mathura stone inscription of Chandragupta II describes Samudragupta as "the restorer of the Ashvamedha sacrifice that had been long in abeyance" (Smith's translation). This claim also appears in the inscriptions of the subsequent Gupta kings, as well as the spurious Gaya and Nalanda inscriptions attributed to Samudragupta. However, several kings including those from Bharashiva, Vakataka, Shalankayana, and Pallava dynasties had had performed Ashvamedha in the preceding years. Different scholars have attempted to explain this anomaly in different ways: H. C. Raychaudhuri suggests that the Gupta court poet did not know about these kings. According to R. C. Majumdar, Samudragupta was the first king several centuries to perform the sacrifice in the Magadha region. Majumdar also theorizes that the Ashvamedha ceremony performed by Bharashiva, Vakataka, and other near-contemporary kings was "more of a religious nature", while Samudragupta's ceremony actually involved proving his imperial sovereignty. Similarly, scholars such as S. K. Aiyangar and D. R. Bhandarkar, theorize that unlike the other kings, Samudragupta performed a "full-fledged" Ashvamedha ceremony. Others, such as V. S. Pathak and Jagannath Agrawal, interpret the verse to mean that Samudragupta performed the horse-ritual that lasted for a long-time.

The surviving verses of Samudragupta's own Allahabad Pillar inscription do not mention the Ashvamedha ceremony. According to one theory, this inscription was put up to mark the beginning of the ceremony, as the panegyrics of the sacrificer were an essential part of the Ashvamedha ceremony. It is possible that its first four lines, which are now lost, contained a reference to the ceremony.

== Personality ==
Samudragupta's coins depict him as a man of tall stature and muscular physique. The Allahabad Pillar inscription presents him as a compassionate ruler, stating that his "mind was engaged in providing relief to the low, the poor, the helpless, and the afflicted". It also mentions that he reinstated many royal families which had lost their kingdoms, including the kings defeated by him. At the same time, it states that he maintained strict administration ("Prachanda shasana").

The inscription states that Samudragupta became famous among the learned people because of his poetical works, and earned the epithet "king of poets". This suggests that he composed some poetical works, but none of these works now survive.

The inscription also boasts that Samudragupta put to shame the celestial musician Tumburu and Narada by his lovely performances of music. Samudragupta's musical talents are also corroborated by his gold coins which depict him playing a veena.

The inscription praises Samudragupta's wisdom and intellect, stating that he put to shame the preceptor of the Lord of the Gods (that is, Brihaspati) by his sharp intellect.

== Legacy ==
Vincent Smith referred to Samudragupta as the "Indian Napoleon" due to his remarkable military campaigns and strategic prowess. His achievements included the total defeat of adversaries in Aryavarta, extensive expeditions in the Deccan across long distances and inhospitable terrains, and a notable expedition across the Indus River. This last expedition, which might have been led by Samudragupta himself or his son Chandragupta II, demonstrated his exceptional military skill and strategic acumen.

The comparison between Samudragupta and Napoleon is relevant in several aspects. Both rulers organized their empires in a broadly similar fashion. Napoleon’s empire, centered around France and including adjacent Dutch, Belgian, German, and Italian regions, was surrounded by a network of allied and protected states such as Spain, the Confederation of the Rhine, the Grand Duchy of Warsaw, and the Kingdoms of Italy and Naples. Similarly, Samudragupta’s empire encompassed nearly all of northern India, excluding regions like Sindh, much of Kashmir and western Rajasthan

Samudragupta's empire was vast and strategically organized. It encompassed nearly the whole of modern Uttar Pradesh, Bihar, part of Bengal, and a significant portion of eastern Malwa. Beyond a ring of tributary states were the Saka and Kushaṇ principalities in the northwest, twelve states in the Deccan, Kerala as well as Simhala (Sri Lanka) and several other islands. These regions were either allies or were compelled to show respect towards the empire, forming a second line of defense beyond the primary ring of tributary states.

Samudragupta's imperial structure resembled that of Napoleon’s organizational strategy, featuring a strong central core surrounded by friendly states and dependencies. Like Napoleon, Samudragupta was influenced by the prevailing ideologies of his time. His Allahabad Prasasti (inscription) reflects his aspiration for chakravartitva or universal sovereignty, a Hindu ideal prevalent during the Gupta era, which sought to establish overlordship over all of Bharatavarsha (India). This ideal can be compared to Napoleon’s vision of a European Commonwealth under French hegemony. Unlike Napoleon, whose ambitions were curtailed after the Battle of Waterloo, Samudragupta successfully realized his vision and celebrated his achievements with the performance of an Asvamedha (horse sacrifice).

The Asvamedha performed by Samudragupta was of an elaborate type, denoted by the term chirotsanna, rather than the abbreviated form that was more common during that period. It is generally believed that this grand celebration occurred sometime after the inscription of the Allahabad Prasasti. However, it is also possible that the Asvamedha was conducted around the same time as the inscription.

It is believed that the Allahabad Prasasti was composed in conjunction with the performance of Samudragupta’s Asvamedha sacrifice. This elaborate type of sacrifice, known as chirotsanna, included prateyya or hymns praising the sacrificer and long-ago kings, performed by lute-players including a Rajanya who sang three self-composed songs. It is possible that the Asokan pillar, on which the prasasti was engraved, was used as an ornamental post during the sacrifice. Prayaga (modern-day Allahabad) was the original seat of the Gupta dynasty.

Samudragupta's reign marked a significant revival of Brahmanical religion, which had declined since Emperor Ashoka's promotion of Buddhism. Samudragupta represents a Hindu response to Ashoka’s Buddhist ideals. While Ashoka sought to be a chakravarti dharmika dharmaraja—a ruler who conquered through righteousness (dhamma) rather than force—Samudragupta aimed to be a traditional chakravartin through military conquest. Both emperors were considered dharma vijayins (victors through righteousness), but their concepts of achieving righteousness differed. Ashoka emphasized the moral aspects of religion, while Samudragupta focused on traditional martial and political authority

The question of whether Vikramaditya existed or is a legend is unresolved. However, it is well established that Samudragupta was the first historical ruler to assume the title of Vikrama. Elements of the Vikramaditya legend can be traced back to both Samudragupta and his son Chandragupta II, reflecting their personalities and achievements.

== Indian Embassy to Rome ==
According to a Roman historian, an Indian embassy arrived in Rome in 351 CE, although it had been dispatched from India earlier. This event holds historical significance when viewed in the context of the political conditions in India during the mid-fourth century.

Before 361 CE, Rome was at war with the Sassanian Empire. During this period, it was plausible that Samudragupta, a prominent Indian ruler, might have sought to support Roman efforts against the Sassanians by sending an embassy. By aligning with Kidāra against Shapur II, Samudragupta would have aimed to keep Sassanian forces occupied and distracted.

In light of the political dynamics in Bactria and North-Western India, there is a suggestion that Kalidasa's portrayal of Raghu's conquests in his work, "Raghuvaṃśa," might be based on the actual historical events of Samudragupta's campaigns. Kalidasa describes Raghu's military expeditions, including the conquest of Trikūta in the Deccan and subsequent campaigns against the Parasikas, Hunas, and Kambojas.

Kalidasa's epic, therefore, might reflect the real historical interactions and conflicts of the time, providing a literary perspective on the political and military landscape of the era.

== Succession ==
The official records of the Gupta dynasty state that Samudragupta was succeeded by Chandragupta II, who was his son from Dattadevi. Based on a reconstruction of the partially-lost Sanskrit play Devichandraguptam, a section of modern historians believe that Samudragupta was initially succeeded by Ramagupta (presumably the eldest son), who was then dethroned by Chandragupta II.
