= Amarpur =

Amarpur may refer to:

- Amarpur, Banka, a town in Bihar state, India
  - Amarpur, Bihar Assembly constituency state assembly constituency centered around the town
- Amarpur, Tripura, a town in Tripura state, India
  - Amarpur, Tripura Assembly constituency state assembly constituency centered around the town
- Amarpura Jatan, a village in Rajasthan, India
- Amarpur, Nepal

== See also ==
- Amaravati (disambiguation)
