= Amarapuram =

Amarapur, Amarapura or Amarapuram may refer to:

- Several villages in Karnataka, India:
  - Amarapur, Belgaum, a village in Bailhongal Taluka, Belgaum District
  - Amarapur, Gadag, a village in Shirhatti Taluka, Gadag District
  - Amarapur, Koppal, a village in Koppal Taluka, Koppal District
  - Amarapur, Raichur, a village in Sindhanur Taluka, Raichur District
  - Amarapur Khadehola, a village in Sindhanur Taluka, Raichur District
  - Amarapura, Bellary, a village in Bellary Taluka, Bellary District
- Other places in India:
  - Amarapur, Gujarat, a village in Mansa Taluka of Gandhinagar district, Gujarat
  - Amarapuram, Andhra Pradesh, a town and mandal in Anantapur District, Andhra Pradesh
  - Amarapuram, Tamil Nadu, a village in Thoothukudi District, Tamil Nadu
  - former name for Hulimavu in Bangalore, Karnataka
- Places in Myanmar
  - Amarapura, a town and former capital of Burma (Myanmar)
  - Amarapura District, a district and township of Mandalay Region

== See also ==
- Amaravati (disambiguation)
