= Goli archeological excavation =

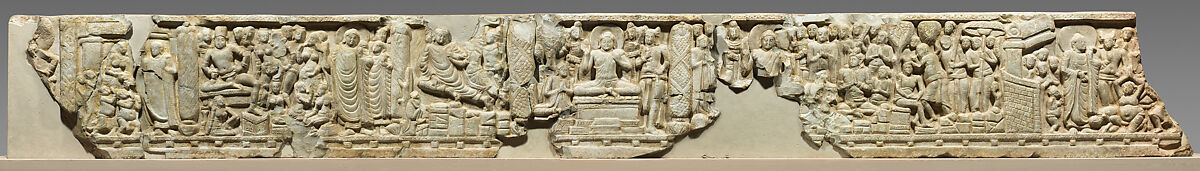
The Conversion and Ordination of Nanda, The Met

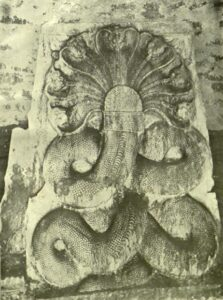
7-hooded Mucalinda panel from the Goli stupa, worshipped as Nagamayya

The Goli archeological excavation was carried out in 1926 by Gabriel Joveau-Dubreuil in Goli village, in Palnadu district located in Andhra Pradesh, India. The remains of a stupa were found, clad in Palnadu limestone panels. Scenes from the Jataka tales and the Buddha's life are prominent themes. The archeological evidence of a Vihāra consists of two carved pillars and a votive stupa, which may have been part of a monastic establishment.

They are similar in execution to the fourth phase of the Amaravati Stupa (Ikshvaku period). The remains were transferred to the Government Museum, Chennai, and some of them have found their way into other museums such as the Metropolitan Museum of Art and the British Museum The Goli findings were published by T N Ramachandran of the then Madras Government Museum in 1929.

The Rentala monastery and Manchikallu monastic cluster are found not far from Goli.

A solitary seven-hooded Mucalinda panel has been enshrined in situ as Nagamayyā. It is non-figural, i.e. Buddha is represented as a stupa, not an image.

== See also ==
- A virtual exhibition of the Goli Sculptures from the Government Museum, Chennai.
