= Amaravati (disambiguation) =

Amaravati is the capital of the Indian state of Andhra Pradesh.

Amaravati, Amaravathi or Amravati may also refer to:

== Geography ==
=== India ===
- Amaravathi, Palnadu district in Andhra Pradesh, modern village near the stupa
- Amaravathi mandal, Andhra Pradesh, a mandal in Palnadu district headquartered at Amaravathi
- Amravati, a city in the state of Maharashtra, India
  - Amravati district, a district of Maharashtra state
  - Amravati division, a division of Maharashtra state
- Amaravathinagar, a town in Tamil Nadu state
  - Amaravathi Dam, a dam at Amaravathinagar, 25 kilometres (16 mi) south of Udumalpet, Tamil Nadu, India
  - Amaravathi Reservoir, the Amaravathi Dam impoundment on the edge of Indira Gandhi Wildlife Sanctuary
- Amaravati River, a river in the states of Kerala and Tamil Nadu, India

=== Others ===
- Amaravati, principality in the ancient kingdom of Champa in Central Vietnam

== Religion ==
- Amaravati (mythology), the capital of Svarga, one of the seven planes of Hinduism
- Amaravati, a Pali word meaning "Abode of the Deathless", which refers to nirvana
- Amaravati Stupa, a ruined Buddhist stupa near the village of Amaravathi
- Amaravati art, regional style of sculpture, 1st century BC to 4th century CE, after the Amaravati Stupa
- Amaravati Buddhist Monastery, a Theravada Buddhist monastery located in Hertfordshire, UK

== Railways ==
- Amravati railway station, in Maharashtra, India
- Amaravati Express, express train operated by Indian Railways

== Entertainment ==
- Amaravathi (1993 film), a 1993 Indian Tamil-language film
- Amaravathi (2009 film), a 2009 Indian Telugu-language film

== See also ==
- Amarapuram (disambiguation)
