= Amarpur, Nepal =

Place in Nepal

Amarpur, Nepal अमरपुर
- Village Development Committee
- Location in Nepal
- Coordinates: 28.15°N 83.17°E
- Country: Nepal
- Zone: Lumbini Zone
- District: Gulmi District

Population (2011)
  - Total: 3,598
- Time zone: UTC+5:45 (Nepal Time)

Amarpur is a village and municipality in Gulmi District in the Lumbini Zone of central Nepal. At the time of the 2011 Nepal census it had a population of 3598 people living in 840 individual households.
