= Manchikallu =

- Village
- Interactive map of Manchikallu
- Location in Andhra Pradesh, India
- Coordinates: 16.501°N 79.530°E
- Country: India
- State: Andhra Pradesh
- District: Palnadu
- Mandal: Rentachintala

Government
  - Type: Panchayati raj
  - Body: Manchikallu gram panchayat

Area
  - Total: 1,395 ha (3,450 acres)

Population (2011)
  - Total: 3,693
  - Density: 264.7/km^{2} (685.7/sq mi)

Languages
  - Official: Telugu
- Time zone: UTC+5:30 (IST)
- PIN: 522421
- Area code: +91–8642
- Vehicle registration: AP

Manchikallu is a village in Palnadu district of the Indian state of Andhra Pradesh. It is located in Rentachintala mandal of Gurazala revenue division.

== Governance ==
Manchikallu gram panchayat is the local self-government of the village.

== Government and politics ==
Manchikallu gram panchayat is the local self-government of the village. It is divided into wards and each ward is represented by a ward member. The ward members are headed by a Sarpanch.
