= Goli, Andhra Pradesh =

Goli
- Village
- Interactive map of Goli
- Location in Andhra Pradesh, India
- Coordinates: 16°35′21″N 79°31′25″E
- Country: India
- State: Andhra Pradesh
- District: Palnadu

Area
  - Total: 27.59 km^{2} (10.65 sq mi)

Population (2011)
  - Total: 5,726
  - Density: 207.5/km^{2} (537.5/sq mi)

Languages
  - Official: Telugu
- Time zone: UTC+5:30 (IST)
- PIN: 589831

Goli is a village in Palnadu district of the Indian state of Andhra Pradesh. It is situated on the right bank of the river Goleru, which joins the Krishna River two miles to the north. It is located in Rentachintala mandal of Palnadu district in Andhra Pradesh, India. It is situated 5 km away from sub-district headquarters Rentachintala (tehsildar office) and 120 km away from Guntur. It is 49.7 km downstream of Nagarjunakonda (by road) and 113 km upstream of Amaravathi.

As per 2009 statistics, Jettipalem is the Gram Panchayat of Goli village. The total geographical area of the village is 2759 hectares. As per the 2011 census, Goli has a total population of 5,726 people, out of which male population is 2,890 while female population is 2,836. The literacy rate of Goli village is 39.94% out of which 48.44% males and 31.28% females are literate. There are about 1,484 houses in Goli village.

Macherla is the nearest town to Goli for all major economic activities, which is approximately 18 km away.

== Goli archeological excavation ==
Goli was the site of archaeological excavation in 1926 by Gabriel Joveau-Dubreuil. The remains of a stupa were found, clad in Palnadu limestone panels. Scenes from the Jataka tales and the Buddha's life are prominent themes. The archeological evidence of a Vihāra consisted of two carved pillars and a votive stupa, which may have been part of a monastic establishment. A solitary seven-hooded Mucalinda panel has been enshrined in situ in the village as Nagamayyā. It is non-figural, i.e. Buddha is represented as a stupa, not an image.

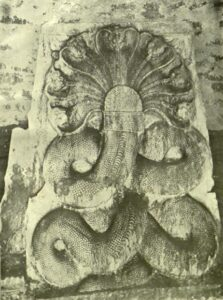
7-hooded Mucalinda panel from the Goli stupa, worshipped as Nagamayya
