= Amarapur, Belgaum =

Amarapur
- Village
- Location in Karnataka, India Amarapur (India)
- Coordinates: 14°08′N 76°59′E
- Country: India
- State: Karnataka
- District: Belgaum
- Talukas: Bailhongal

Languages
  - Official: Kannada
- Time zone: UTC+5:30 (IST)

Amarapur is a village in Belgaum district in the southern state of Karnataka, India. Amarapur is in Bailhongal Taluka, which is sometimes known as Sampgaon Taluka.
