= Amarapuram, Tamil Nadu =

Amarapuram
- village
- Location in Tamil Nadu, India Amarapuram (India)
- Coordinates: 8°28′30″N 77°59′54″E
- Country: India
- State: Tamil Nadu

Languages
  - Official: Tamil
- Time zone: UTC+5:30 (IST)
- Nearest city: Thiruchendur

Amarapuram is a village in the state of Tamil Nadu in India. It is located at the banks of Karamanayar River in Thoothukudi District, about 15 km South of Thiruchendur.

Amarapuram is the home of twin temples: Kasankathaperumal and Kasamadiamman Temple and Sudalaimadaswamy and Petchiamman Temple. The main temple festival (Kodai) is held annually in the month of Purataasi. There is a check dam on Karumeni river at Amarapuram.
