= Gabriel Jouveau-Dubreuil =

French archaeologist

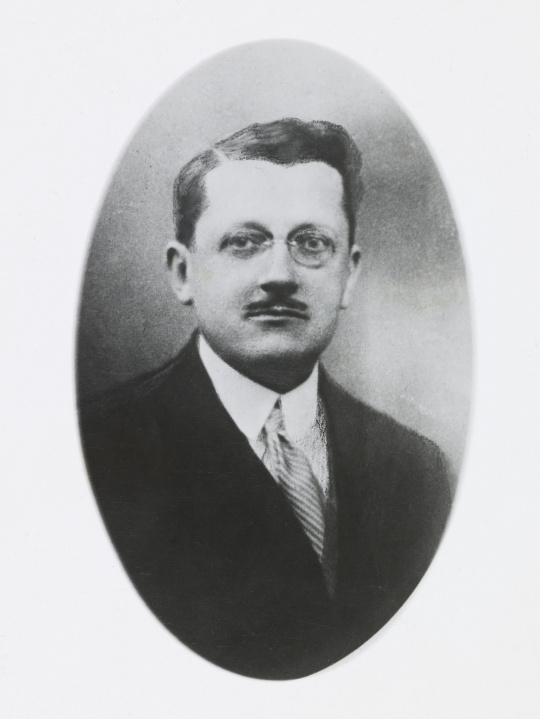
- Born: January 1, 1885; Saigon
- Died: July 1, 1945 (aged 60)

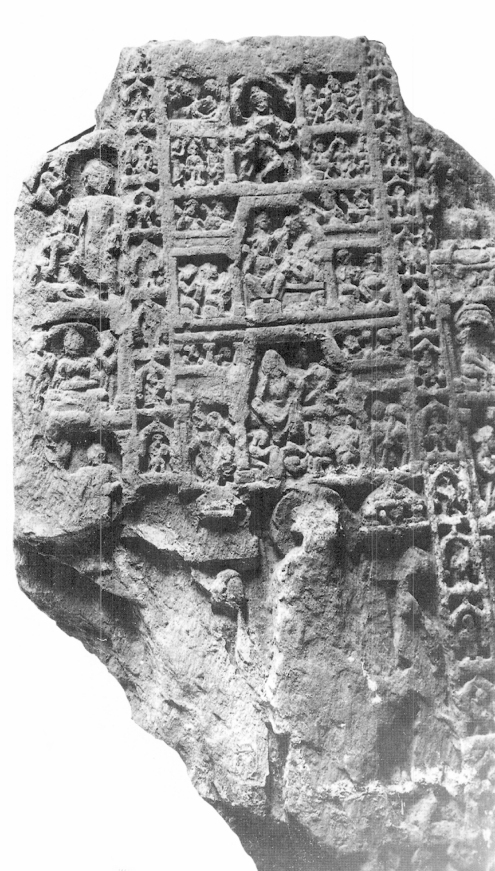
Fragment of a Buddhist relief from Paitava, photographed by Gabriel Jouveau-Dubreuil.

Gabriel Jouveau-Dubreuil (1885 –1945) was a French archaeologist who specialized in Southern India.

Jouveau-Dubreuil was the first discoverer of artifacts at Nagarjunakonda in Andhra Pradesh in 1926, before systematic digging was taken over by A. H. Longhurst in 1927. He also excavated the Stupa at Goli, Andhra Pradesh in 1926. He published both in French and English.

== Works ==
- Archaeologie du Sud de l'Inde Vol. 1 Vol.2
- Ancient History of the Deccan
- The Pallavas
- Pallava Antiquities
