= Amarpura Jatan =

Village in Rajasthan, India

- Village
- Location in Rajasthan, India Amarpura Jatan (India)
- Coordinates: 29.31°N 73.79°E
- Country: India
- State: Rajasthan
- District: Ganganagar

Area
  - Total: 42.51 km^{2} (16.41 sq mi)
- Elevation: 170 m (560 ft)

Population (2011)
  - Total: 2,043
  - Density: 48.06/km^{2} (124.5/sq mi)

Languages
- Time zone: UTC+5:30 (IST)
- Telephone code: 01509
- ISO 3166 code: RJ-IN
- Vehicle registration: RJ—13
- Nearest city: Suratgarh
- Literacy: 79%
- Climate: Sunny (Köppen)

Amarpura Jatan is a small farming village in the Sri Ganganagar's Suratgarh municipality in the state of Rajasthan. It is located in the Bikaner district and is about 42.51 square kilometers in area.

According to the 2011 Census, Amarpura Jatan is home to 2,043 people and consists of 346 households. Males take up about 48% of the population and females, 52% Children under 6 years of age represent around 13% of the population. Amarpura Jatan's literacy rate is about 69.1%, higher than the Ganganagar district's overall average of 60.6%. A 2020 population estimate totals the population at 2,425. Amarpura Jatan is within the Suratgarh constituency, whose legislature is the Rajasthan Legislative Assembly.

Agriculturally, Amarpura Jatan produces wheat, cottonseed, and guar.
