= Amarapur, Gujarat =

Amarapur
- Village
- Location in Gujarat, India Amarapur (India)
- Coordinates: 23.369905°N 72.720346°E
- Country: India
- State: Gujarat
- District: Gandhinagar

Languages
  - Official: Gujarati, Hindi
- Time zone: UTC+5:30 (IST)
- Vehicle registration: GJ-2
- Nearest city: Gandhinagar

Amarapur is a village in Mansa Taluka of Gandhinagar district in Gujarat, India. It is situated on the banks of Sabarmati River.

== Institutes ==
Grambharati, a social service organisation, runs several cooperative societies and the National Innovation Foundation - India. The institute is involved in innovation in grassroots technology and traditional knowledge.

== Economy ==
Agriculture is the main source of income for this village. Swapna Shrishti Water Park is located near the village.
