= Mahameghavahana dynasty =

Ancient Indian dynasty

Maha-Meghavahana Dynasty
- 2nd or 1st century BC–4th century CE
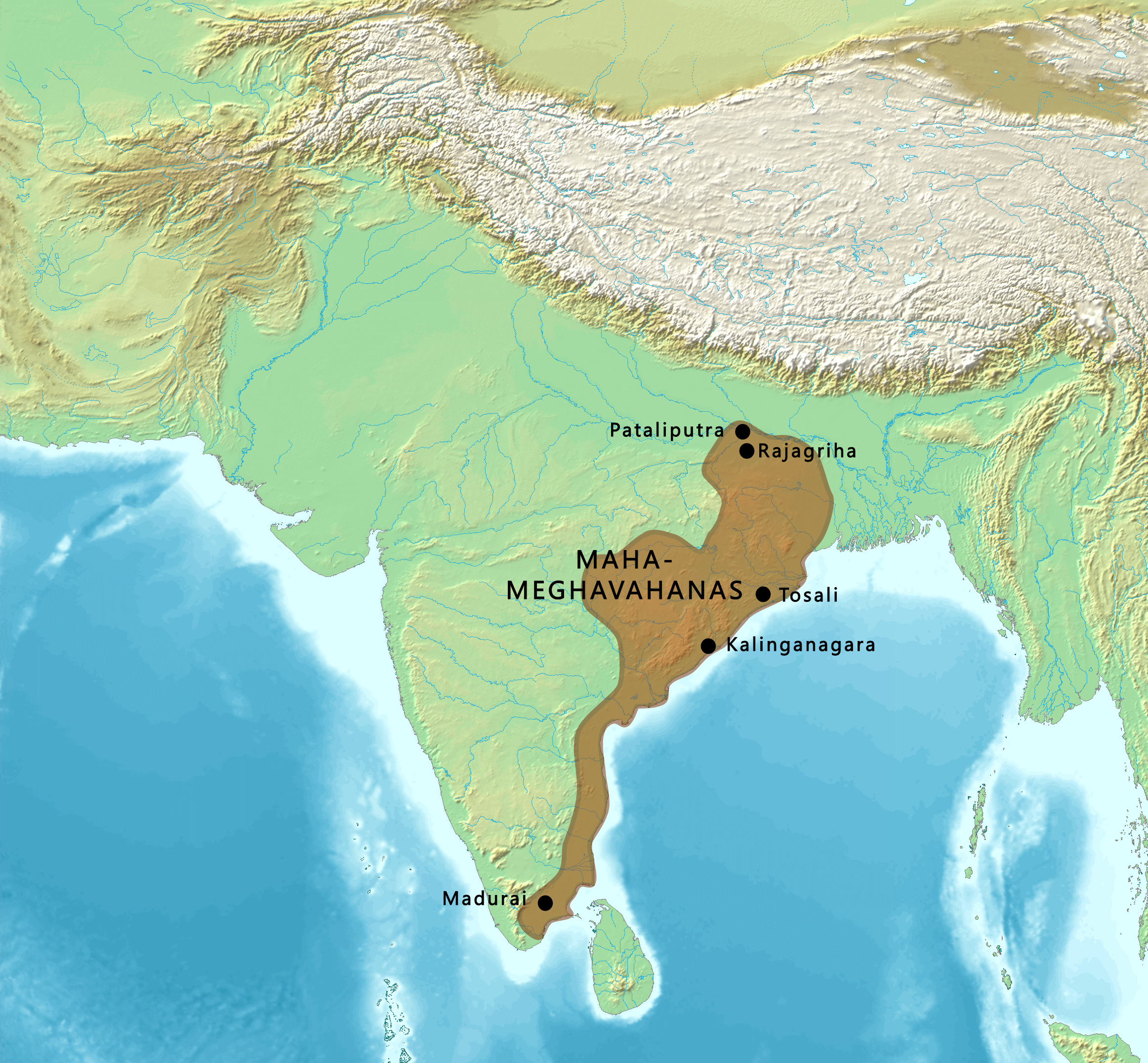
- Extent of the Maha-Meghavahanas, circa 20 BCE.
- Status: Empire
- Capital: Toshali; Kalinganagara
- Common languages: Ardhamagadhi Prakrit (official, court procedural, and inscriptional); Sanskrit (Literature)
- Religion: Jainism (official); Ajivikism; Buddhism; Hinduism
- Demonym: Indian
- Government: Monarchy
- Kalingadhipati
  - 170 BCE: Mahameghavahana (founder)
  - 120 BCE: Khemaraja
  - 80 BCE: Vriddharaja
  - 50 BCE: Kharavela
  - 15 BCE: Kudepasiri
- Historical era: Classical India
  - Established: 2nd or 1st century BC
  - Disestablished: 4th century CE

Area
  - Total: 700,000 km^{2} (270,000 sq mi)
Preceded by
Maurya Empire
Satavahanas
Succeeded by
Kushan Empire
Murunda dynasty
Gupta Empire
- Today part of: India

South Asian polities circa 50 CE.

The Mahameghavahana dynasty (IAST: Mahā-Mēgha-Vāhana) 2nd or 1st century BC to early 4th century CE) was an ancient ruling dynasty of Kalinga after the decline of the Maurya Empire. In the first century B.C. conquered Kalinga and Kosala. During the reign of Kharavela, the third king of Mahameghavahana dynasty, South Kosala became an integral part of the kingdom. He patronised Jainism, but did not discriminate against other religions. He is known by his Hathigumpha inscription.

South Kosala was later conquered by Gautamiputra Satakarni of the Satavahana dynasty in the early part of the 2nd century CE and remained in their possession up to the second half of the 2nd century CE. It was during the second and third century CE, the Meghas or Meghavahanas reappeared in the political scene and regained their suzerainty over South Kosala. Samudragupta during his Dakshinapatha expedition, defeated Mahendra of Dakshina Kosala who probably belonged to the Megha dynasty according to a speculation. As a result, the South Kosala during the fourth century A.D, became a part of the Gupta empire.

== List of rulers ==
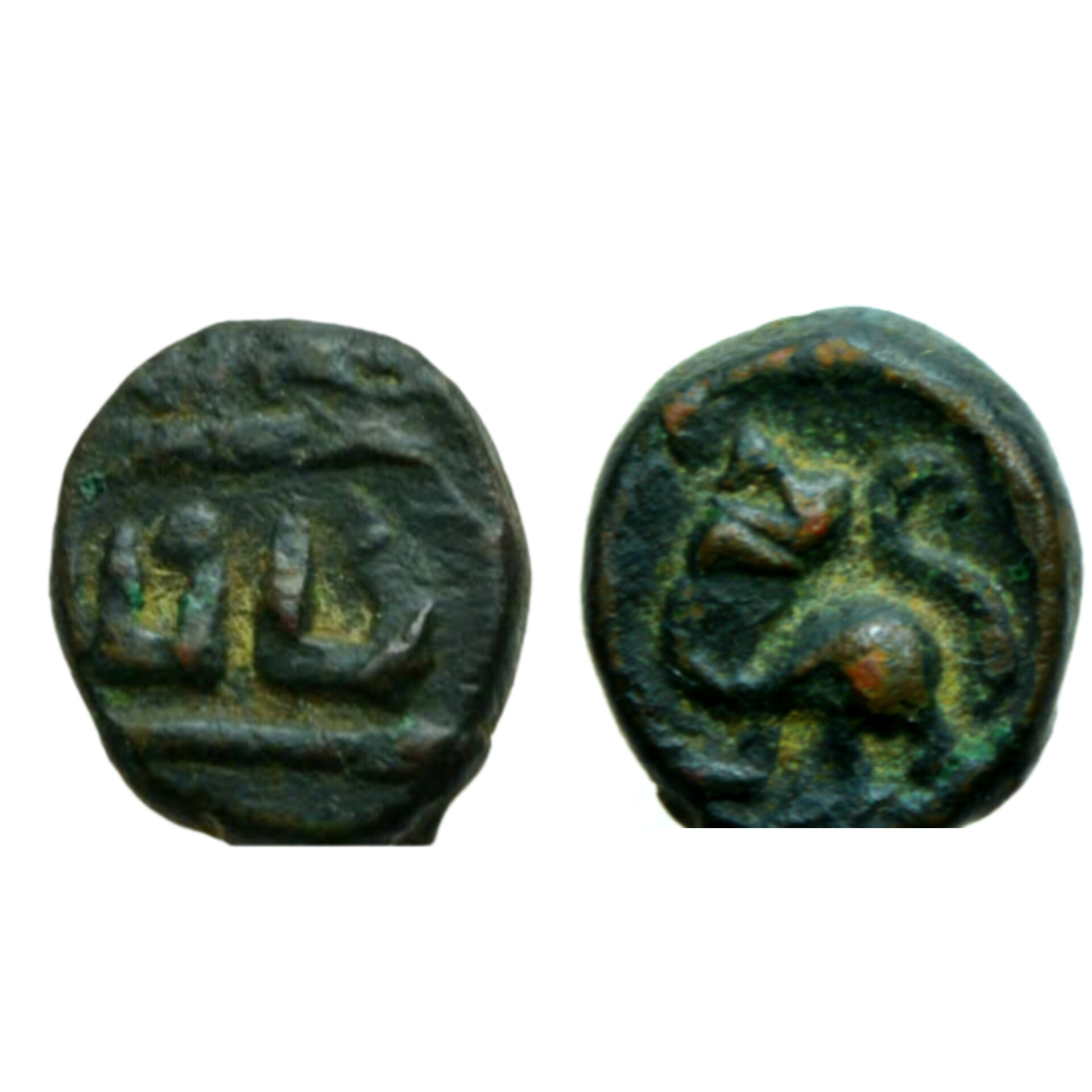
Coin of the Mahameghavahana Dynasty, Left.Brahmi legend Right.Tiger Facing left with raised tail. c. 127-106 BCE

The Hathigumpha inscription describes the following rulers. It does not directly mention the relationship between Mahameghavahana and Kharavela, or the number of kings between them. Some historians have interpreted the inscription to create the following hypothetical family tree:

Lalaka
Khemaraja (a.k.a. Kshemaraja)	Unknown
Vudharaja (a.k.a. Vriddharaja)	Hastisaha (a.k.a. Hastisimha)
Kharavela (a.k.a. Bhiku, Bhikshuraja)	Daughter
Vakradeva (a.k.a. Kudepasiri)
Vadukha (a.k.a. Badukha)

== Kharavela ==
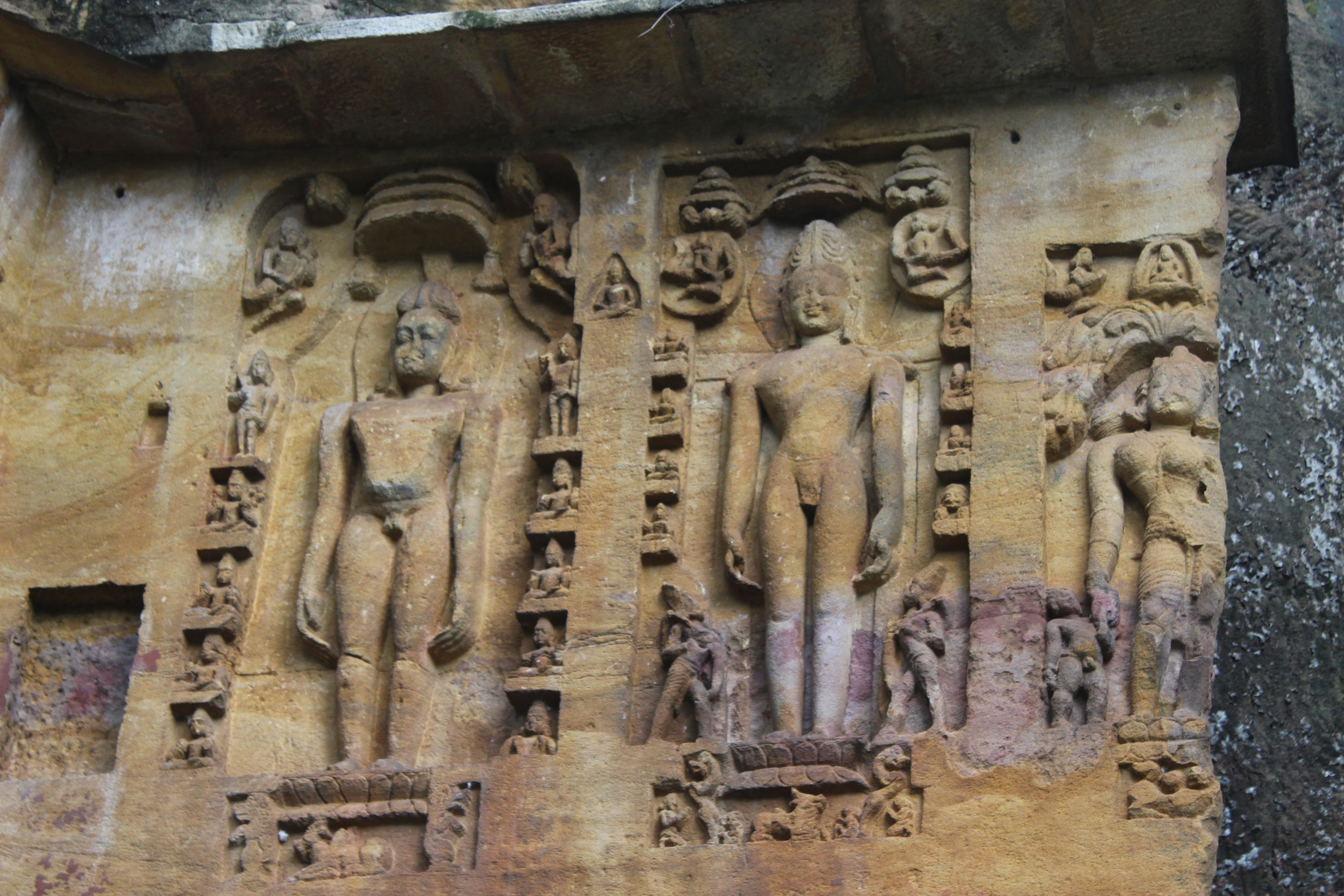
Carving of Rishabhanatha and Ambika, Ambika Gumpha

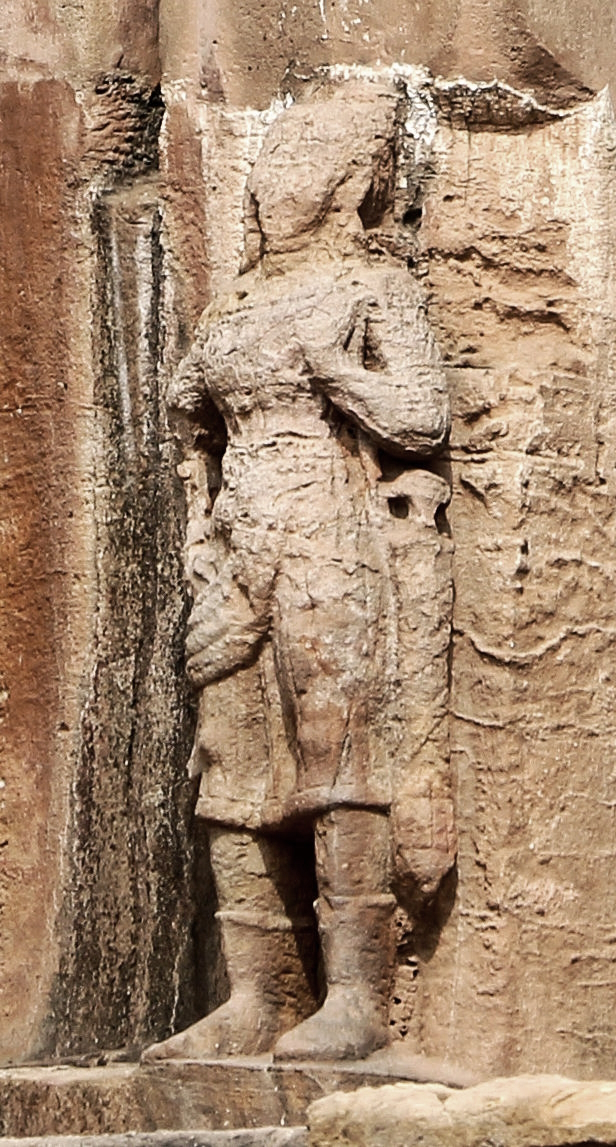
A Yavana warrior sculpture as a guard at the entrance of rani gumpha.

The third ruler of the dynasty, Khārabēḷa, conquered much of India in a series of campaigns at the beginning of the common era. Kaḷingan military might was reinstated by Khārabēḷa: under Khārabēḷa's generalship, the Kaḷinga state had a formidable maritime reach with trade routes linking it to the then-Simhala (Sri Lanka), Burma (Myanmar), Siam (Thailand), Vietnam, Kamboja (Cambodia), Borneo, Bali, Samudra (Sumatra) and Jabadwipa (Java). Khārabēḷa led many successful campaigns against the states of Magadha, Anga, the Satavahanas and the South Indian regions ruled by the Pandyan dynasty (modern Andhra Pradesh) and expanded Kaḷinga as far as the Ganges and the Kaveri.

The Kharavelan state had a formidable maritime empire with trading routes linking it to Sri Lanka, Burma, Thailand, Vietnam, Cambodia, Borneo, Bali, Sumatra and Java. Colonists from Kaḷinga settled in Sri Lanka, Burma, as well as the Maldives and Maritime Southeast Asia. Even today Indians are referred to as Keling in Malaysia because of this.

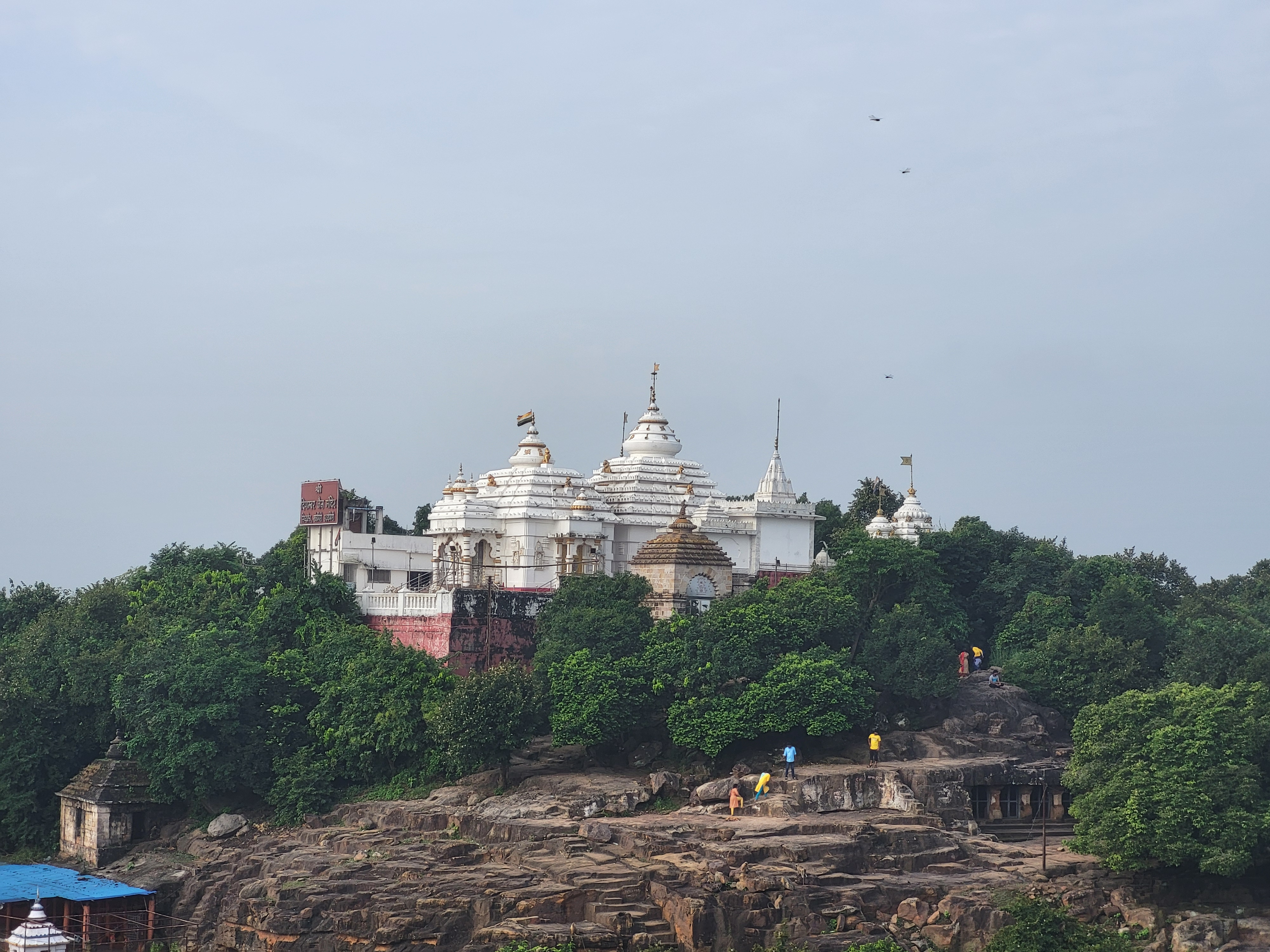
Khandagiri Jain temple, Khandagiri-Udayagiri hills, Bhubaneswar

Although religiously tolerant, Khārabēḷa patronised Jainism, and was responsible for the propagation of Jainism in the Indian subcontinent but his importance is neglected in many accounts of Indian history. The main source of information about Khārabeḷa is his famous seventeen line rock-cut Hātigumphā inscription in the Udayagiri and Khandagiri Caves near Bhubaneswar, Odisha. According to the Hathigumpha inscription, he attacked Rajagriha in Magadha, thus inducing the Indo-Greek king Demetrius I of Bactria to retreat to Mathura.

== Branches of Mahameghavahana Dynasty ==
The Sada dynasty who ruled form Amaravati region in their inscription from Guntapalli describe themselves as Maharaja of Kalinga Mahisaka countries belonging to Mahameghavahana family.

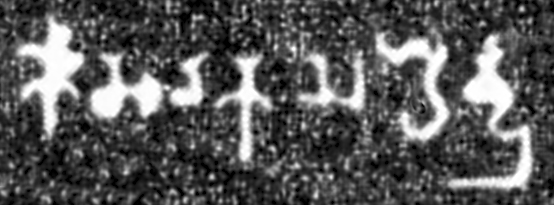
"Mahendra of Kosala" (Brahmi script: Kausalaka Mahendra) in Line 19 of the Allahabad Pillar inscription of Samudragupta (r.350-375 CE)

Meghas of Dakshina Kosala -During the reign of Kharavela, the third king of Mahameghavahana dynasty, South Kosala became an integral part of the Kalinga,from there originated the Kosala branch of the Mahameghavahana dynasty.

Mahendra a king of Dakshina Kosala,was often identified with the Meghas of Kosala, who ruled over Kosala from the 3rd century AD to the 6th century AD.

== Administration ==
The Maha meghavahanas had an organised political structure under the rule of Emperor Kharavela in the 2nd half of the 1st century BC. The Hathigumpha Inscription mentions that the king himself learnt lekha (writing), rupa(coinage), ganana(accountancy), vavahara(law) and vidhi(administration) and acquired mastry over different branches of learning so as to proficient in statescraft. The inscription mentions different army and state officials such as:

- Mahamad
- Nagara Akhadamsa ( City Judge)
- Kamma
- Chaulakamma
- Padamulika

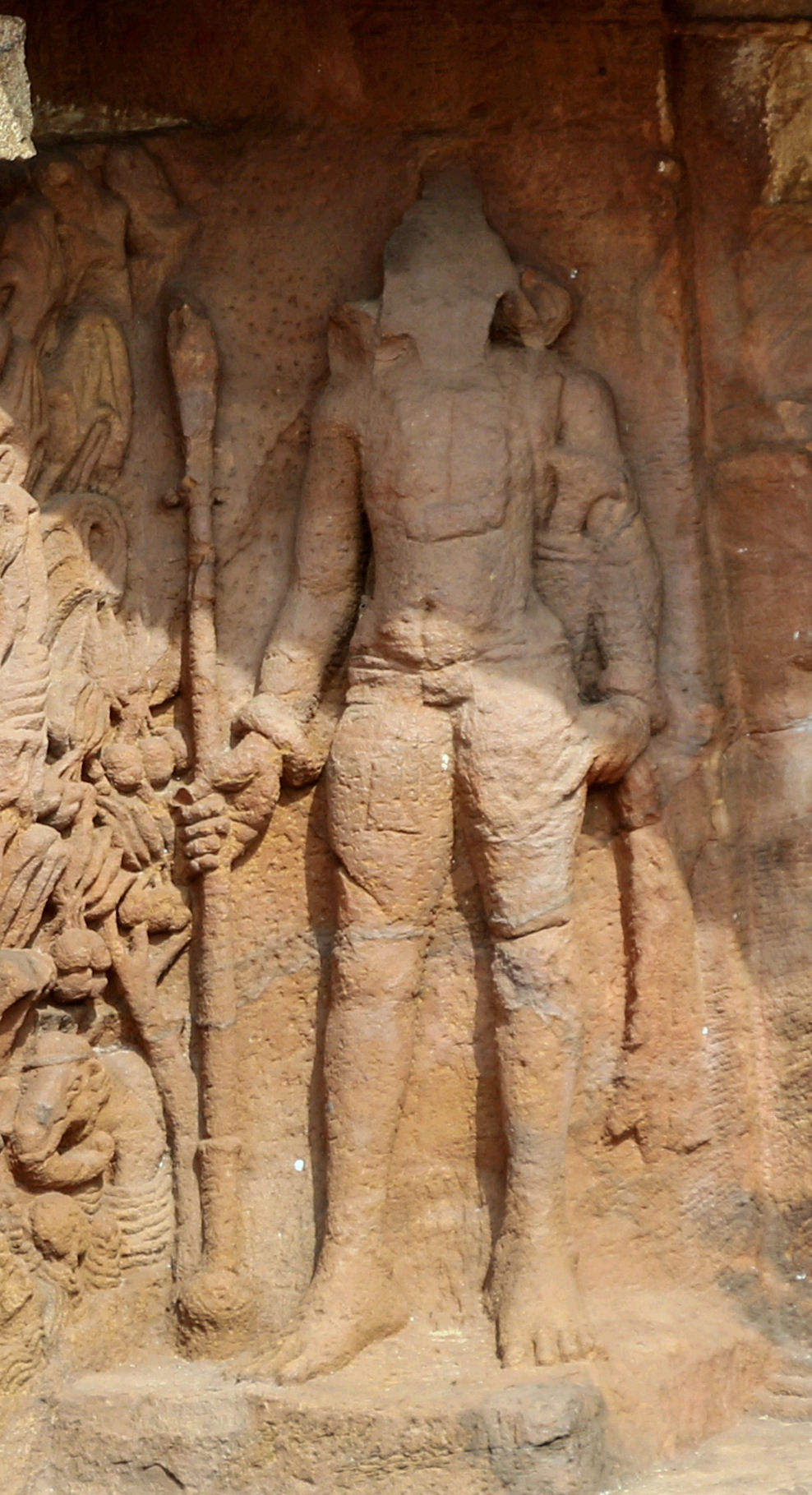
An Indian warrior sculpture during Mahameghavahana dynasty.

The inscription mentions the regular collection and remission of taxes by the government. The inscription also mentions the King's restorative and building activities, building of a canal, a victory palace and an amphitheatre. Agriculture was flourishing in the state.

The inscription mentions the king's possession of a vast army of cavalry, infantry, elephantry and chariots.

== Cultural contribution ==
The Mahameghavahanas patronised the Prakrit language. The Hathigumpha inscription of Kharavela was an earliest known example of a prashasti was inscribed in prakrit language and Brahmi script.

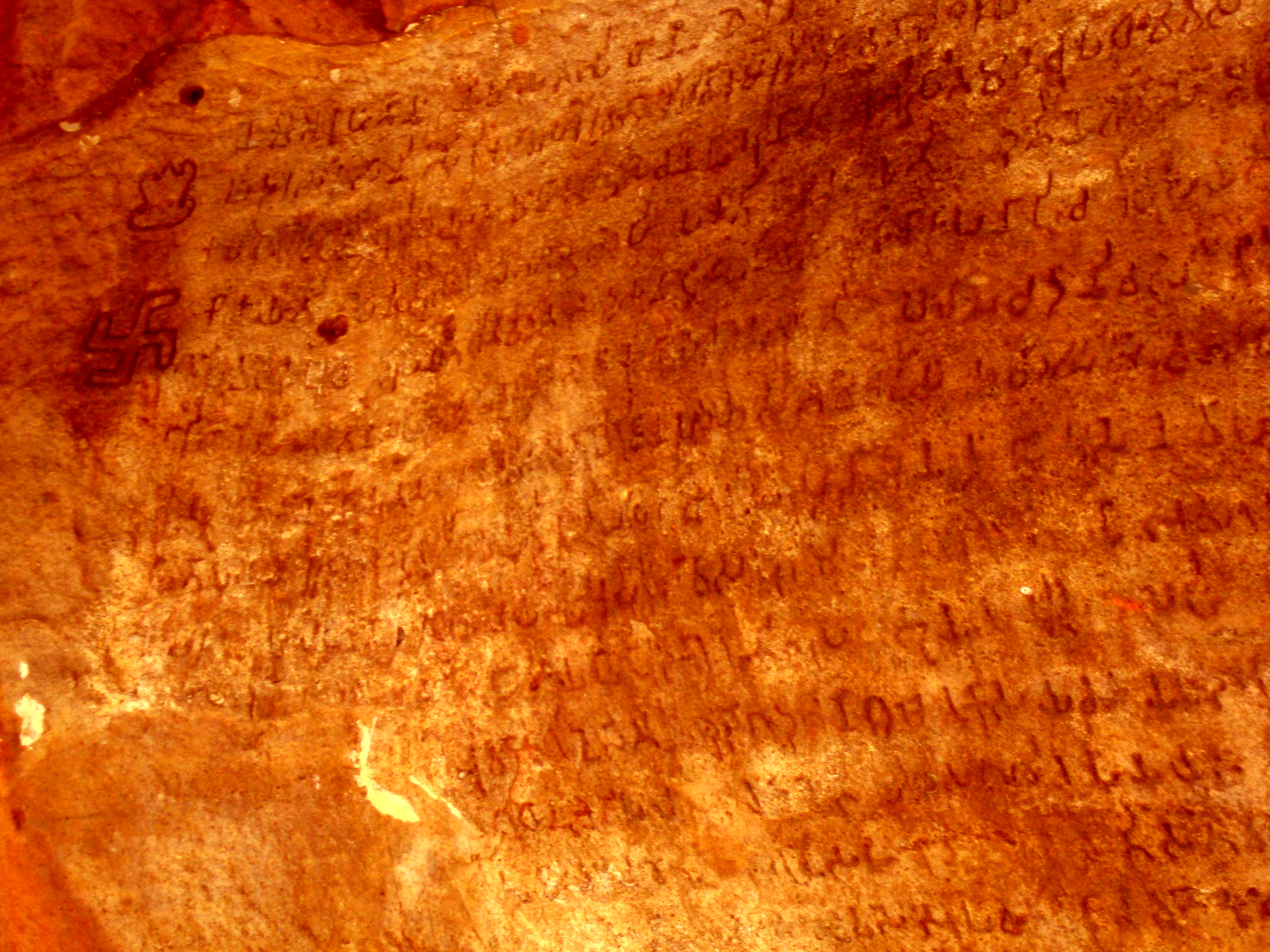
Namokar Mantra (2nd century BCE).

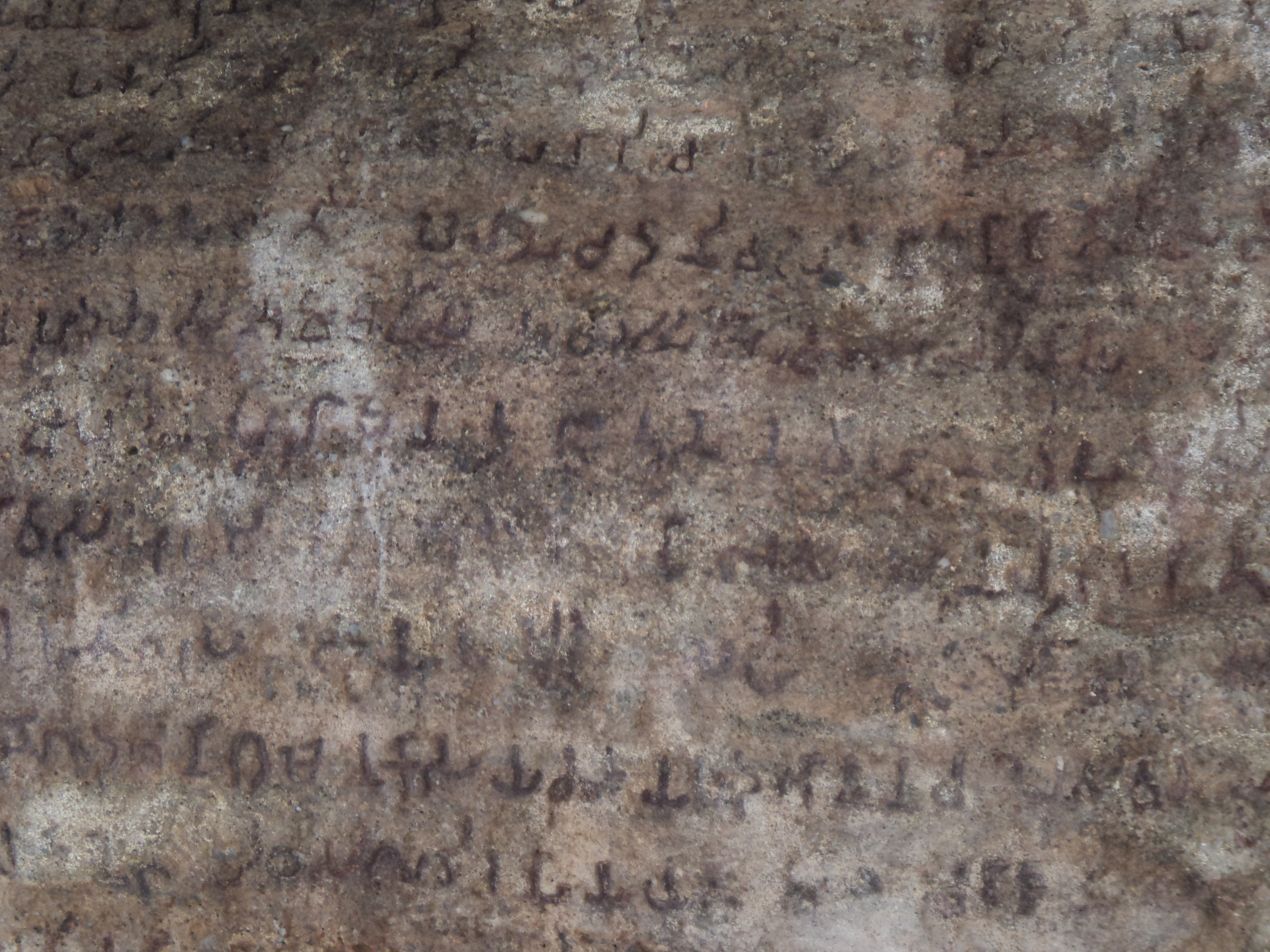
Brahmi Inscription of Kharavela

He is the King of Peace, the King of Prosperity,
the King of Monks (bhikshus), the King of Religion (Dharma),
who has been seeing, hearing and realising blessings (kalyanas),
(... lost ...) accomplished in extraordinary virtues,
respector of every sect, the repairer of all temples,
one whose chariot and army are irresistible,
one whose empire is protected by the chief of the empire (himself),
descended from the family of the Royal Sage Vasu,
the Great conqueror, the King, the illustrious Kharavela.

— Lines 16–17, c. 1st-century BCE Hathigumpha inscription

=== Sculpture ===
The primary source of Mahameghavahana sculpture are the caves of Udaygiri and Khandagiri hills. Most of the caves are extensively carved and beautifully decorated with sculptures.

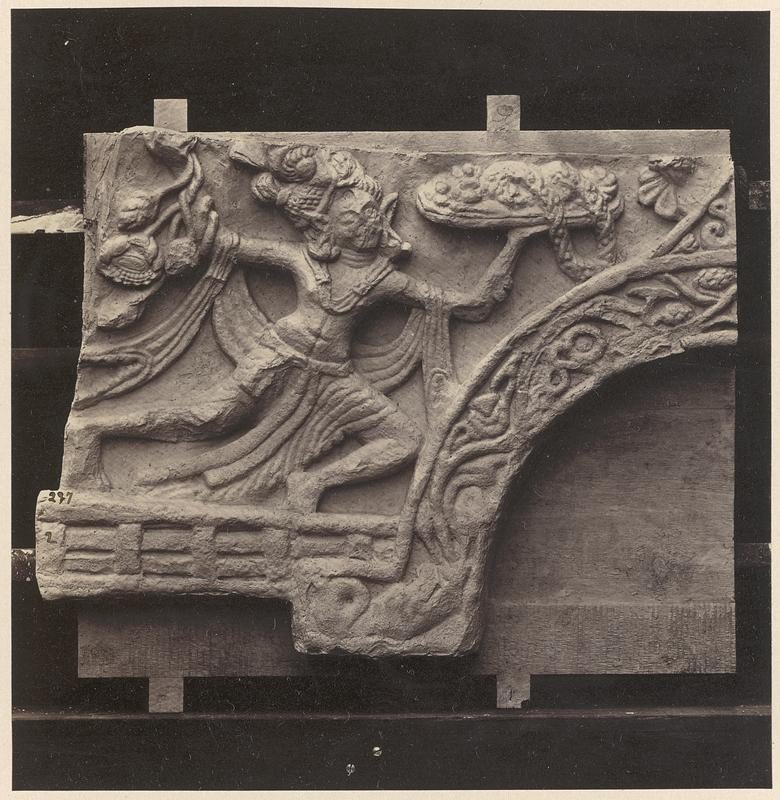
Carving of Apsara making an offering

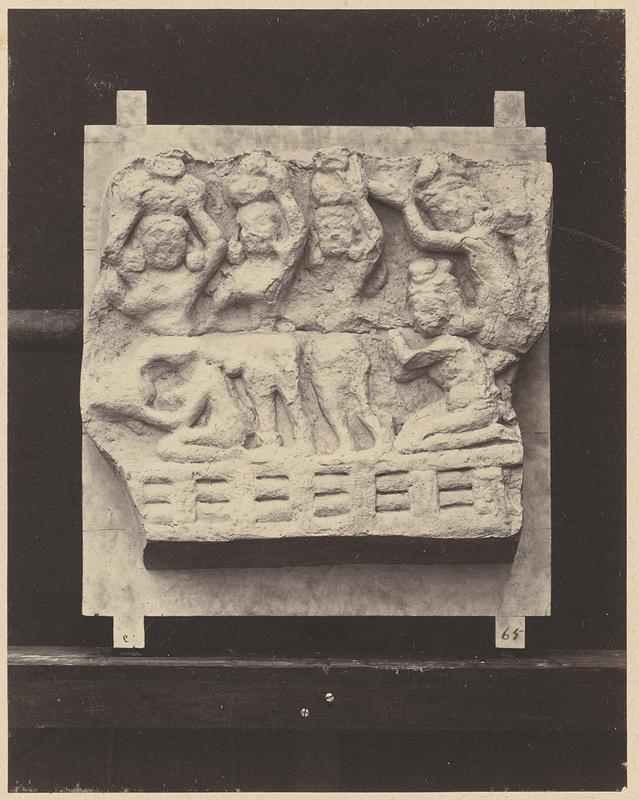
Cast of frieze from Udayagiri and Khandagiri Cave

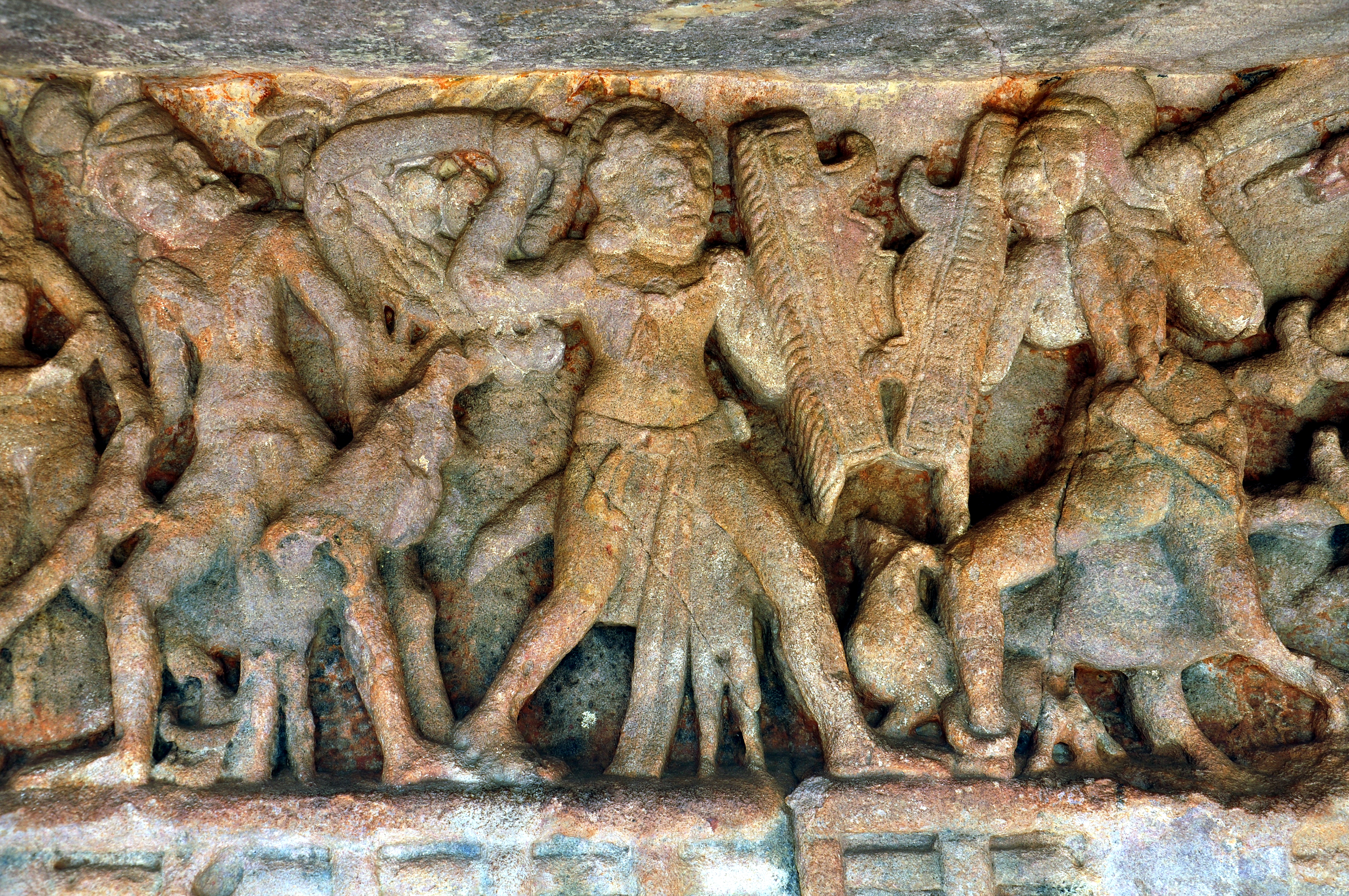
Ancient Indian warfare Khandagiri, one of the earliest depiction of curved sword in Indian context.

== Architecture ==
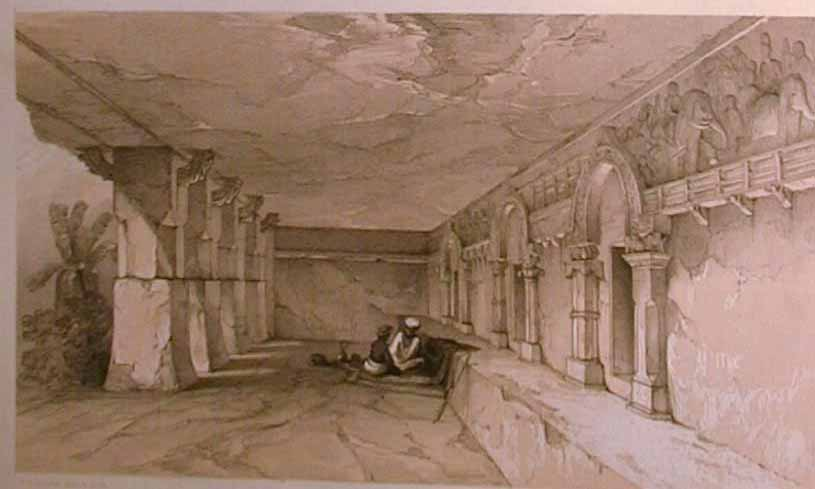
Verandah of the Ganesa Gumpha" ("Ganesh Cave") by James Fergusson, 1845.

Udayagiri and Khandagiri Caves is the most prominent example of Mahameghavahana dynasty work. These caves were built in 2nd century BCE during the rule of King Kharavela. Udayagiri means "Sunrise Hill" and has 18 caves while Khandagiri (means "Broken Hill") has 15 caves. The Hathigumpha cave ("Elephant Cave") has the Hathigumpha inscription, written by Raja Kharavela, the king of Kalinga in India, during the 2nd century BCE. The Hathigumpha inscription consists of seventeen lines incised in deep cut Brahmi letters starting with Jain Namokar Mantra. In Udayagiri, Hathigumpha (cave 14) and Ganeshagumpha (cave 10) are especially well known due to art treasures of their sculptures and reliefs as well as due to their historical importance. Rani ka Naur (Queen's Palace cave, cave 1) is also an extensively carved cave and elaborately embellished with sculptural friezes. Khandagiri offers a fine view back over Bhubaneswar from its summit. The Ananta cave (cave 3) depicts carved figures of women, elephants, athletes, and geese carrying flowers.

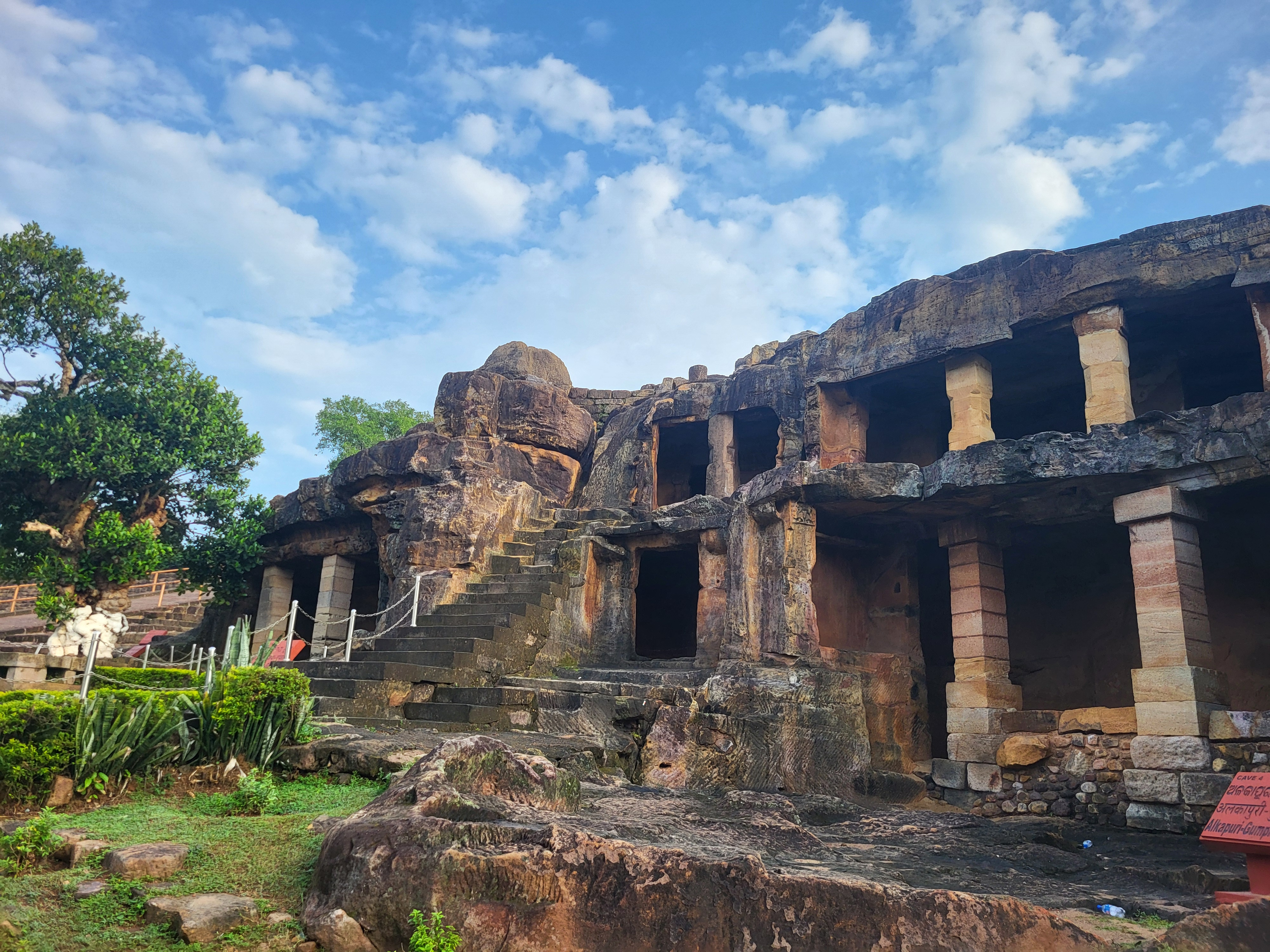

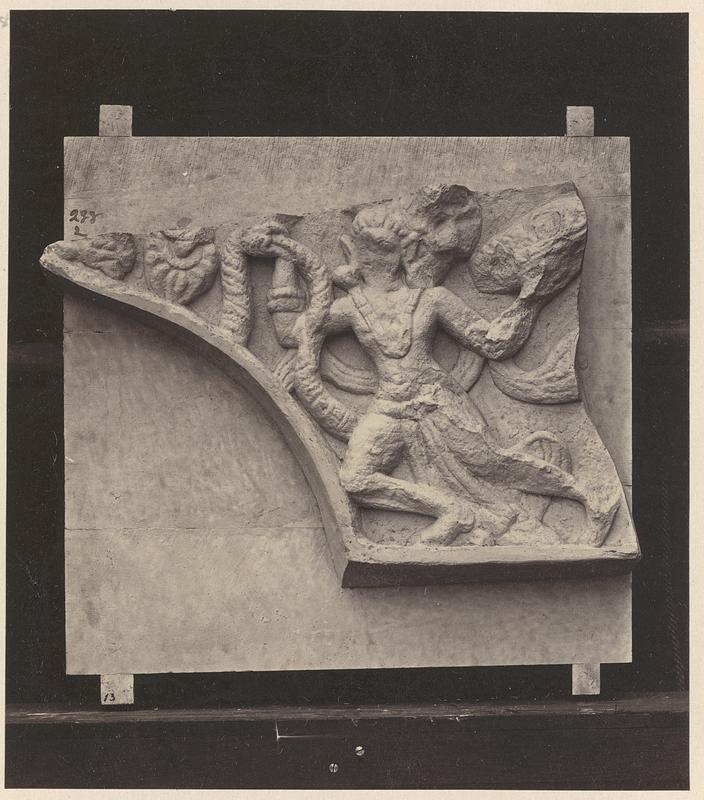

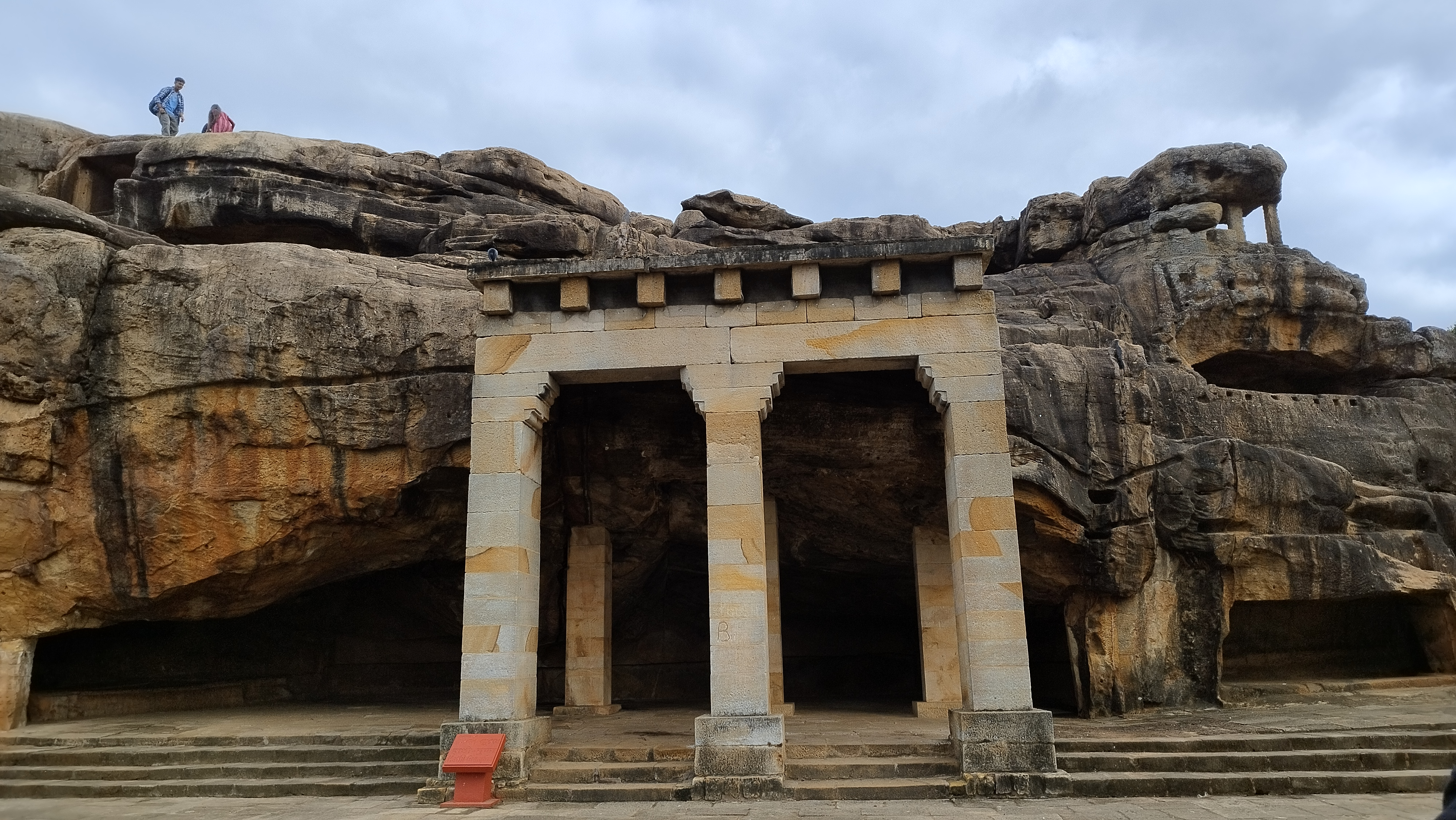
