= Kalinga script =

Historic Brahmic script

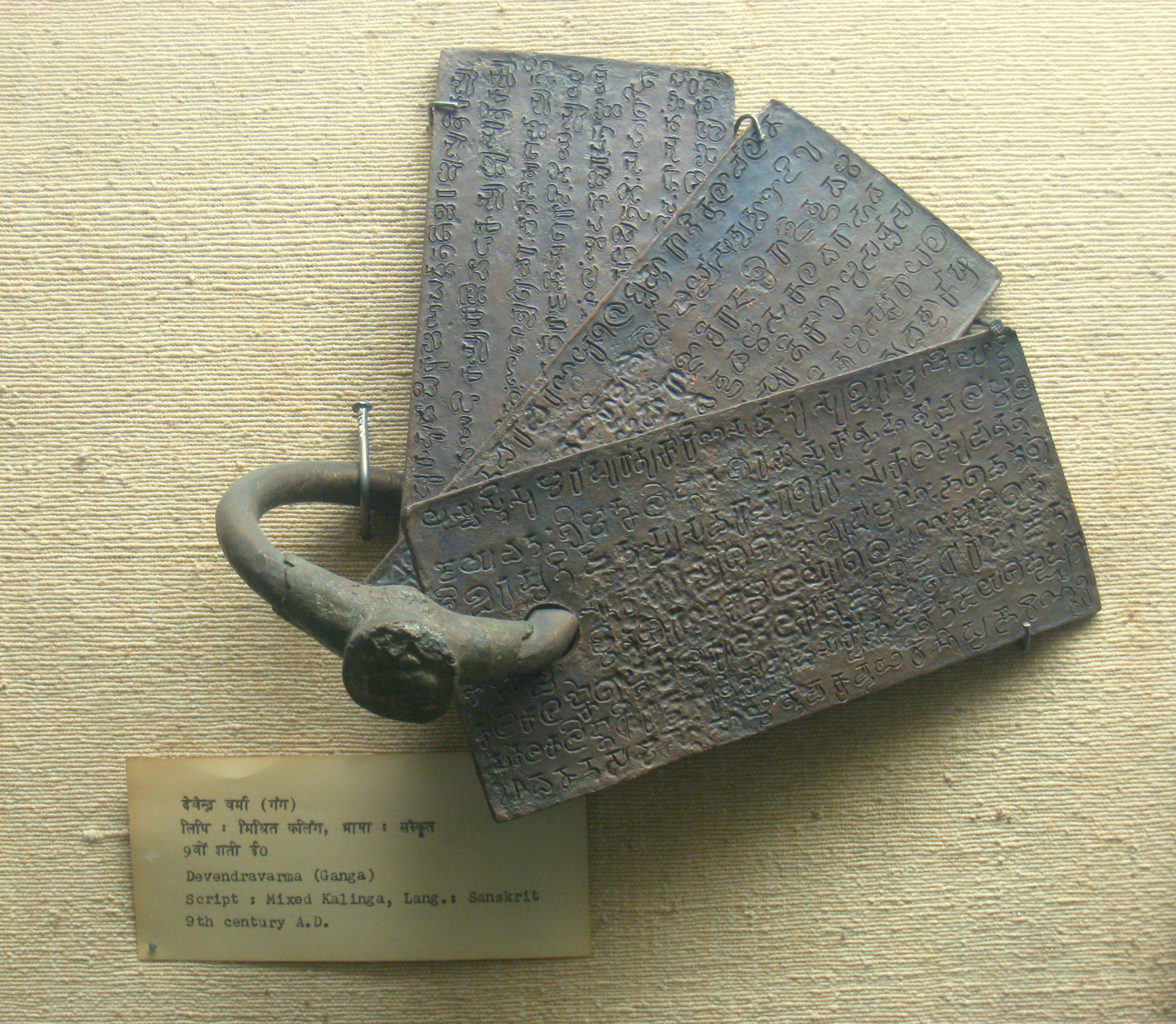
- Devendravarma (Ganga), Sanskrit in Mixed Kalinga script, 9th century AD. Copper plates, exhibited in the National Museum, New Delhi, India
- Script type: Abugida
- Period: c. 600 - 1100 CE
- Direction: Left to Right
- Region: Kalinga
- Languages: Odia language

Related scripts
- Parent systems: Egyptian: Proto-Sinaitic; Phoenician; Aramaic; Brahmi; Gupta; Kalinga script
- Sister systems: Siddham, Sharada, Tibetan, Bhaiksuki

Unicode
- Unicode range: U+0B00 to U+0B7F

The Kalinga script or Southern Nagari is a Brahmic script used in the region of what is now modern-day Odisha, India and was primarily used to write Odia language in the inscriptions of the kingdom of Kalinga which was under the reign of early Eastern Ganga dynasty. By the 12th century, with the defeat of the Somavamshi dynasty by the Eastern Ganga monarch Anantavarman Chodaganga and the subsequent reunification of the Trikalinga(the three regions of ancient Odra- Kalinga, Utkala and Dakshina Koshala) region, the Kalinga script got replaced by the Siddhaṃ script-derived Proto-Oriya script which became the ancestor of the modern Odia script.

== Early Kalinga type/ Kalinga Brahmi ==
The Hathigumpha inscription at Udayagiri caves in Bhubaneswar is written in the deep-cut Brahmi script which is also known as Early Kalinga Type. The Ashoka inscriptions, other inscriptions and fragments of broken pottery from South India are related to Brahmi and these are related to Buddhism. Since the script, which is similar to the ancient Sinhalese script, is found in the Tamil region, its language and script can be assumed to be Tamil.

The use of the 5th century BC Bhatelutu can be seen in the Trincomalee rocks of northeastern Sri Lanka. Therefore, the origin and evolutionary history of the Tamil Brahmi, who aligned themselves with the Votiprolu script, is unclear. Based on the carbon dating of the vessel discovered from Anuradhapur, Sri Lanka, Conningham opined that Brahmi script came to Tamil from Sinhalese and later developed into Tamil Brahmi. Similar versions of the Tamil Brahmi and the Kalinga or Northern Brahmi script are found in the Salihundam, Andhra Pradesh, Arikamedu, Kanchipuram and Korkai inscriptions in Andhra Pradesh. Archaeological excavations along the Arikamedu of Tamil Nadu coastal areas have found a combination of Tamil Brahmi, North brahmi and Sinhalese Brahmi scripts. It is true that the origin or evolution of the script is a social process and cannot be associated with a particular person or dynasty. Since there is no Tamil government system in the interior at this time, it is more relevant for the Kalinga trade system to have a script. The idea of ascending the throne of Kalinga in Sinhala as a region close to Tamil and introducing the agriculture and education system further reinforces this view. So Ashoka was created not by inscriptions, but by the social environment created by the Kalinga shipping, which was the epicenter of the Iron Age. There is a good chance that the Tamil Brahmi script was created and developed by the 5th century. So the Kalinga Brahmi script is older than Sinhalese and Tamil Brahmi.

The Odia script can be taken as the oldest script from Telugu as the successor to the Kalinga Brahmi script. Evidence of a similar connection to the southern Votiprolu script has been found in Lalitgiri, Radhanagar fort in Odisha. The bones of the Buddha were found here, like the village of Votiporlu, while excavating the ruined Buddhist stupas of Lalitgiri. The remains of an ancient Brahmi inscription unearthed from a broken pottery found at the Buddhist shrine of Kayama, Tarapur, Radhanagar near the site have been found. The Deputy Superintendent of the Archaeological Survey of India, J.S. Jayaprakash read it and it dates back to BC. It dates back to the 3rd and 2nd centuries BC. From Tarapur, "Buddha" and "Kesthup" are mentioned on "Bhikshu Tapus dAnam", "Kesthup", "Kalingaraja" and the broken pottery. This article is in line with the topic of asceticism and asceticism of the ascetic, written in Angutarnikaya. This proves that BC. in the sixth century, Tapasu and Vallik built a hair stupa at Tarapur with the hair of a Buddha. Both the Kalinga Brahmi script are included because of the similarity between the scripts obtained from the Tarapur hair stupa and the Votiprolu stupa.

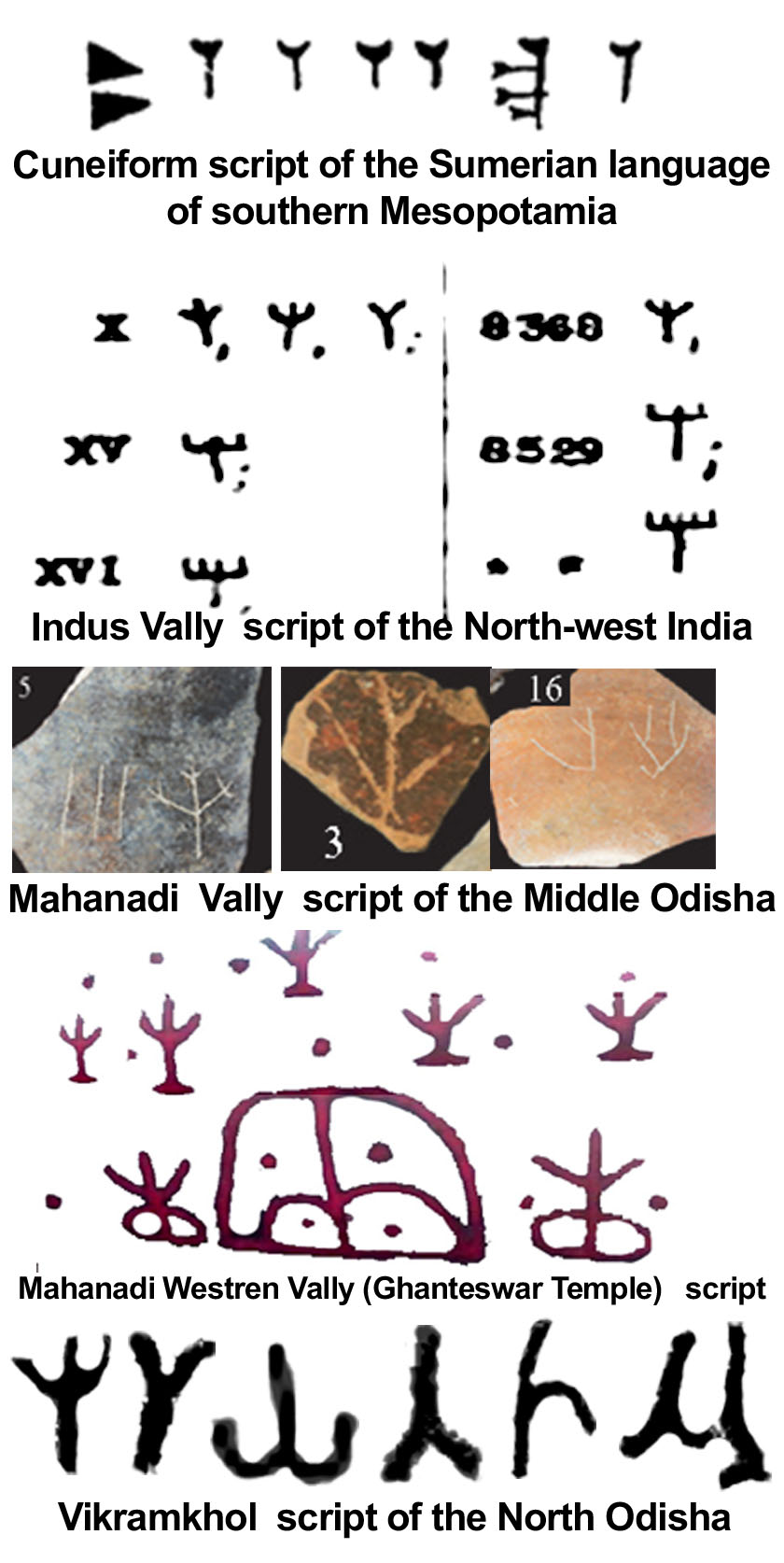
Ancient Script

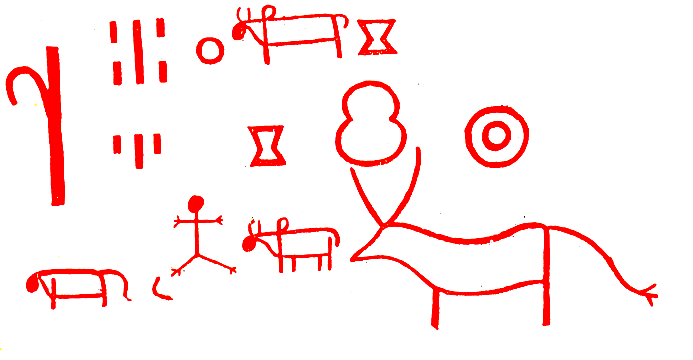
Pre Brahmi Script in yogimath Rock Art at Nuapada of Odisha

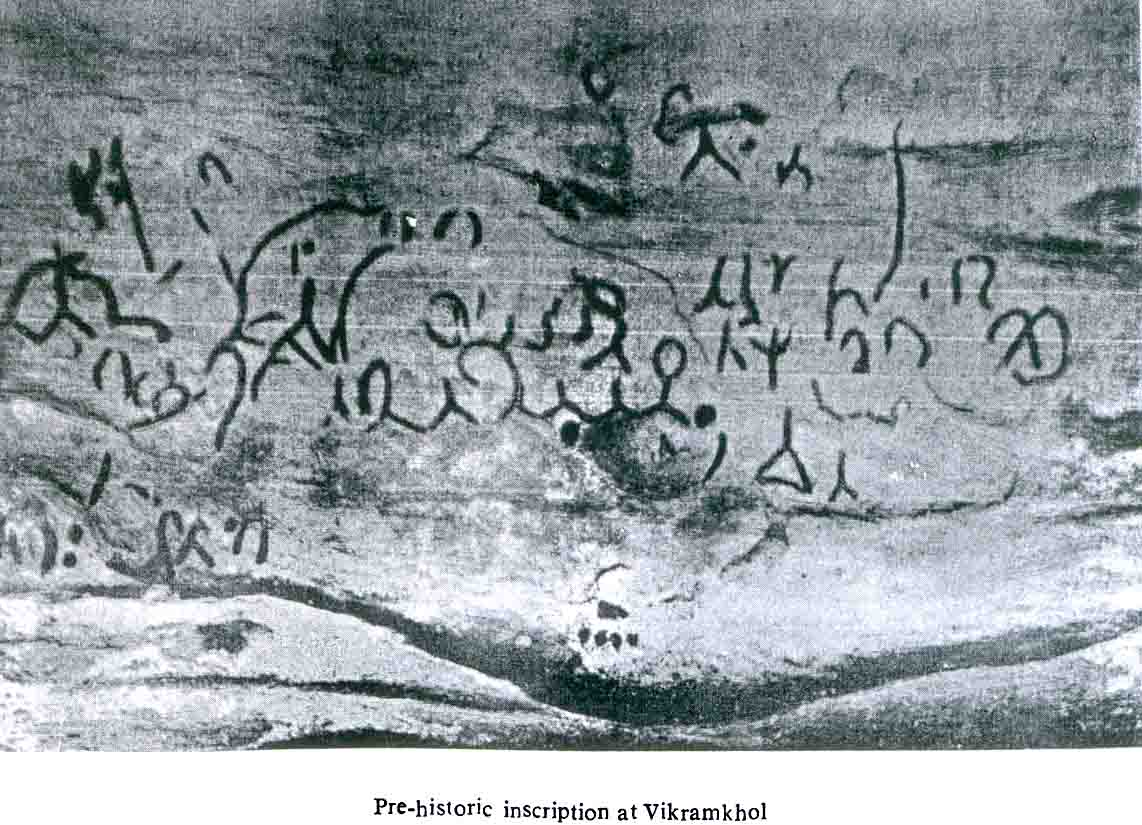
Pre Brahmi Script of Vikramkhol Inscription, Odisha

The childhood form of the Odia Script is the Kalinga Brahmi Script inscribed in stone. This Kalinga Brahmi is prevalent in the Kalinga region, whose language and writing style is different from that of other Brahmi. The Odia and Telugu scripts created from Kalinga Brahmi, which are slightly different from the Maurya Brahmi script, were almost identical to those of Kalinga ruler Kharvel, Satrubhanja to Mathara. Later, autonomy separated both scripts. During this time, the reign of the powerful Pallava ruler, the upper part of the southern branch of Kalinga Brahmi was circled from right to left, while the northern branch was moved from left to right by the Shailodbhav ruler. The Urjam inscriptions show that there was no difference between the Telugu and Odia scripts, as the later Odia and Telugu scripts were mixed in the inscriptions used in the inscriptions of this time. This is because 199 Southern Nagari Scripts, 59 Telugu Scripts, 101 Granth Scripts, 157 Odia scripts and the rest of the Eastern Kings are used in the inscription. Importantly, the authenticity of the Odia script La(‘ଳ’)is clearly inscribed in it.

A study of archives from all over India until the fourth century found that almost all scripts were the same except for a few exceptions. During this time, independent kings began to change the appearance of the script, especially in places, with the introduction of puda, tails, and so on. By the seventh century, there were differences in script and language as they were geographically isolated from each other politically and economically. By the tenth century, the combination of writing and conjugation played a major role in the originality of both texts.

== Later Kalinga script ==
The Later Kalinga script is the writing of the 7th-12th centuries inscriptions during the reign of the early Eastern Ganga dynasty discovered in the Kalinga region which comprises the coastal regions of modern Southern Odisha and northeastern Andhra Pradesh. In earlier forms, the script is strongly mixed with northern and central Indian script forms (Gupta script), while later the mixture with southern Devanagari grew stronger.

In 1872 an advanced Journal ‘Indian Antiquary’ came into existence under the editorship of James Burgess. The Journal was activated with an objective of increasing the existing “Journal of the Asiatic Society of Bengal which gave neoteric encouragement to the paleographic research. Deciding from the developed and practical effective period that Brahmi had attained, Hiralal Ojha was not in support of impute its basis to any peripheral stating point or ascendancy. He advised the addition of the script without any remarkable change approximately from 500 BC to AD 350 where after two disconnect brooks of writing bifurcated from its main source. The northern part was divided into Gupta, Siddham, Nagari, Sarada and Eastern Nagari scripts. The southern part was divided into the western, the central provincial, Telugu-Kannada, Grantha, Kalinga and Tamil scripts. Hiralal Ojha have no doubt that the Oriya script was borrowed from the Siddham script which itself started to bifurcate in about 1000 A.D. According to Hiralal, Kalinga script was used in the copper–plate endowments of the Eastern Gangas from 7th to 11th centuries. Even though at the beginning the script appeared like to the square headed aspects of the central provinces, later on, a distinctive miscellany in which the Telugu–Kannada, Nagari and southern aspects were hybrid all together.

The copper plates of the early Gangas of Kalinganagara show a fundamental difference from the style of writing seen in the earlier groups. Their inscriptions reveal borrowings from the proto-Kannadi scripts or the Rastrakutas. The Canarese influence is seen in the letter t, ch, n, th, d, dh, n and bh.

== Gallery ==
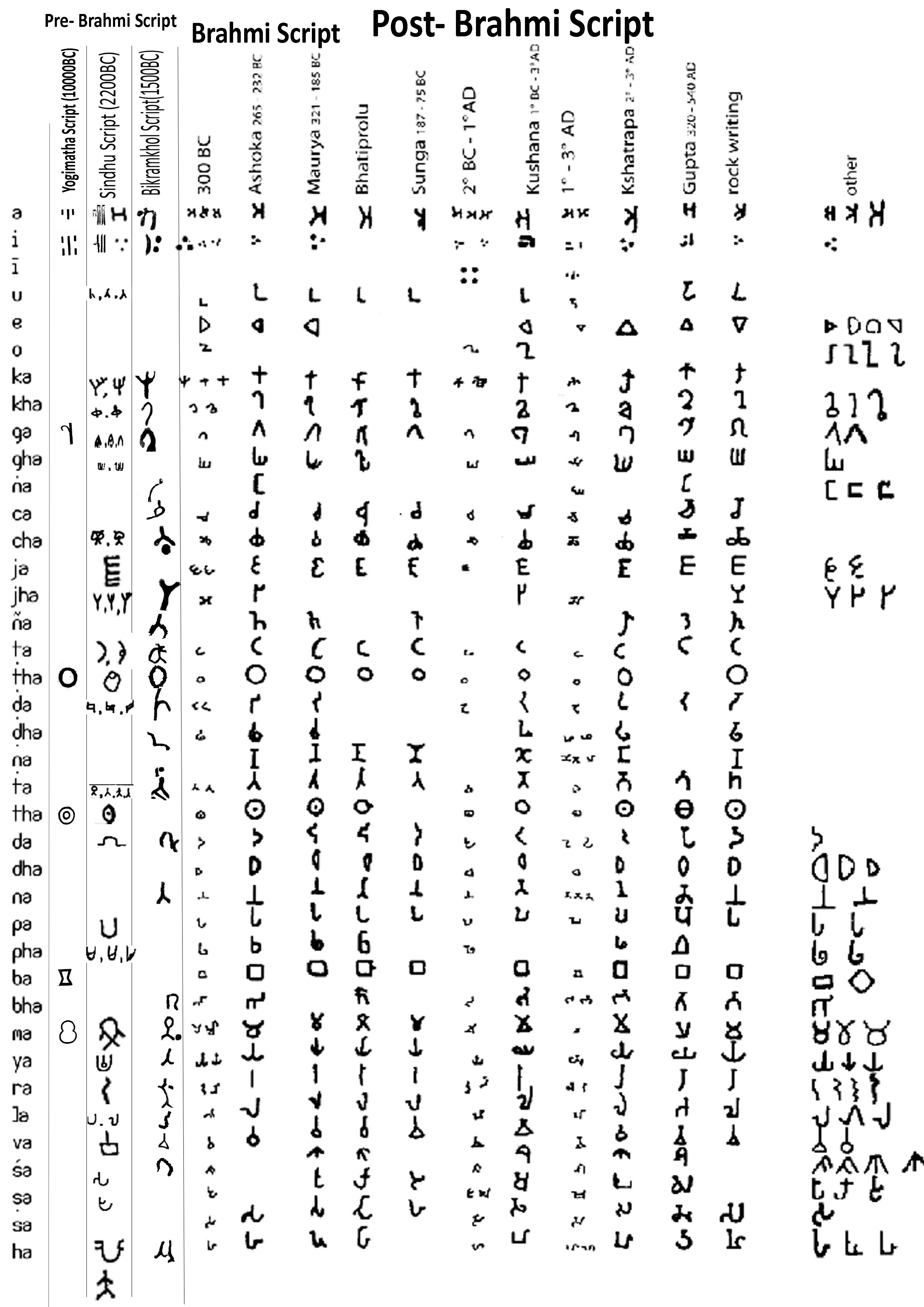
Development of Odia Scripts

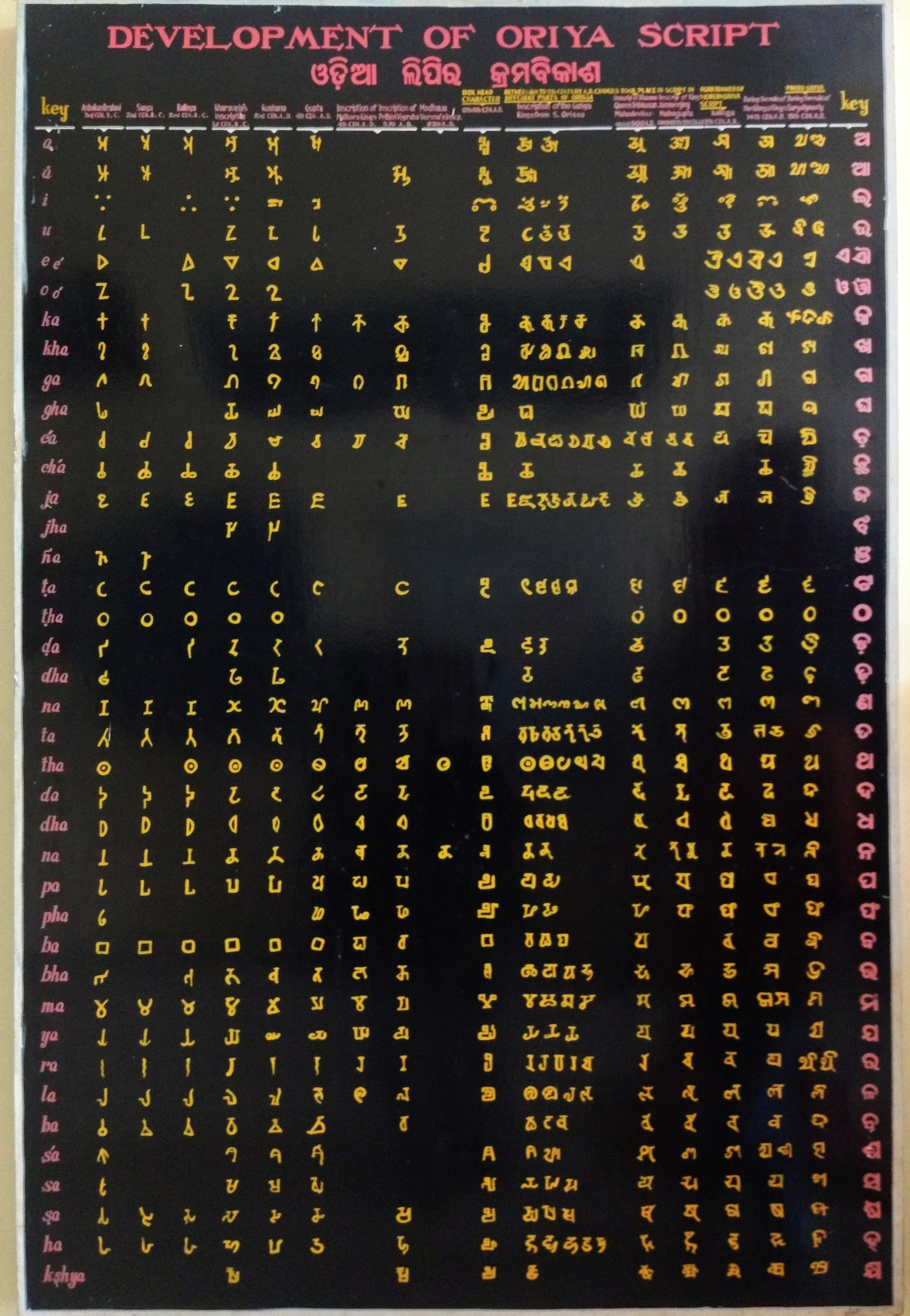
A detailed chart depicting evolution of the Odia script as displayed in a museum at Ratnagiri, Odisha. The southern Orissa column showing the letters of the Kalinga script

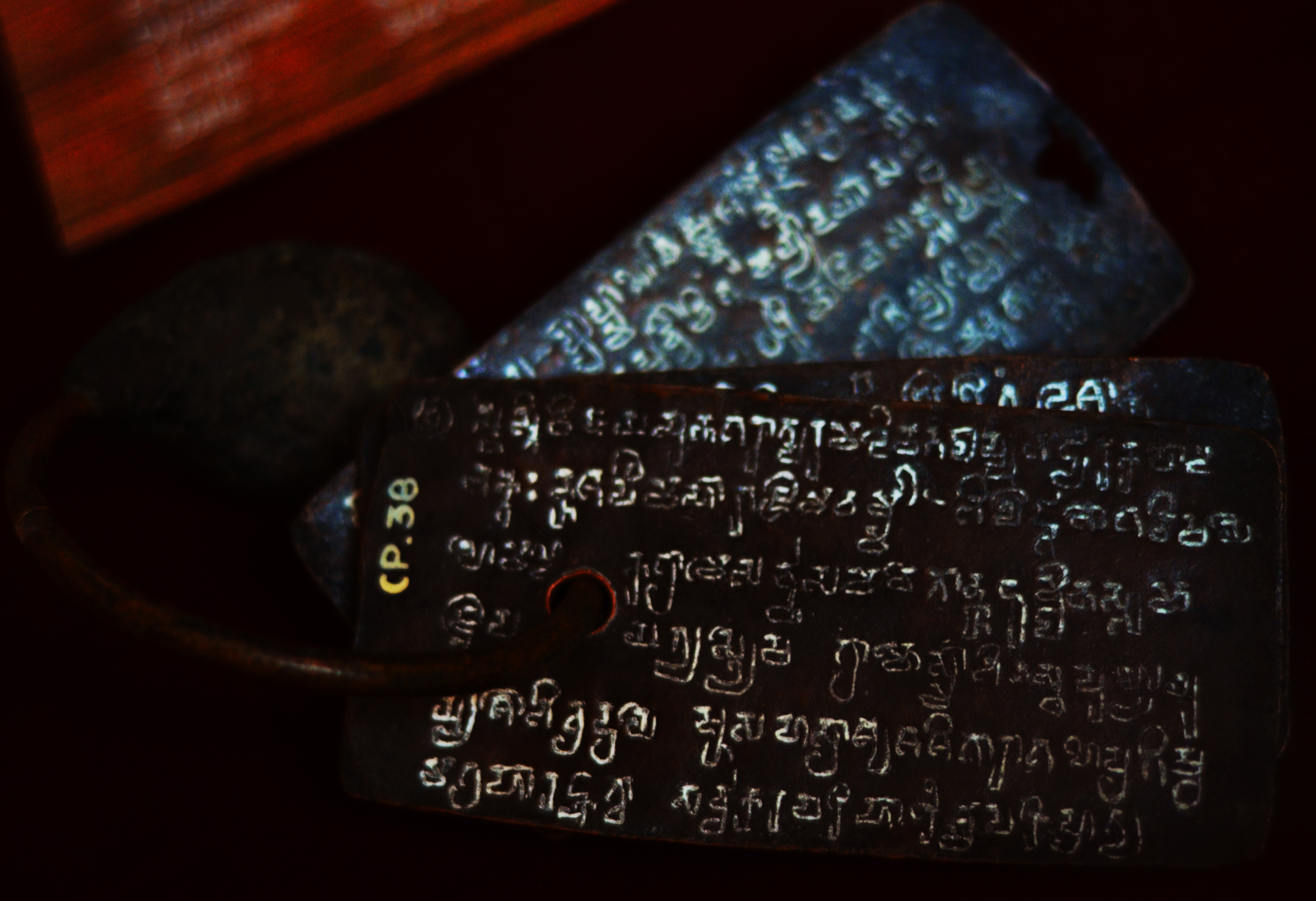
Umarabana-Baranga grant, Kalinga script

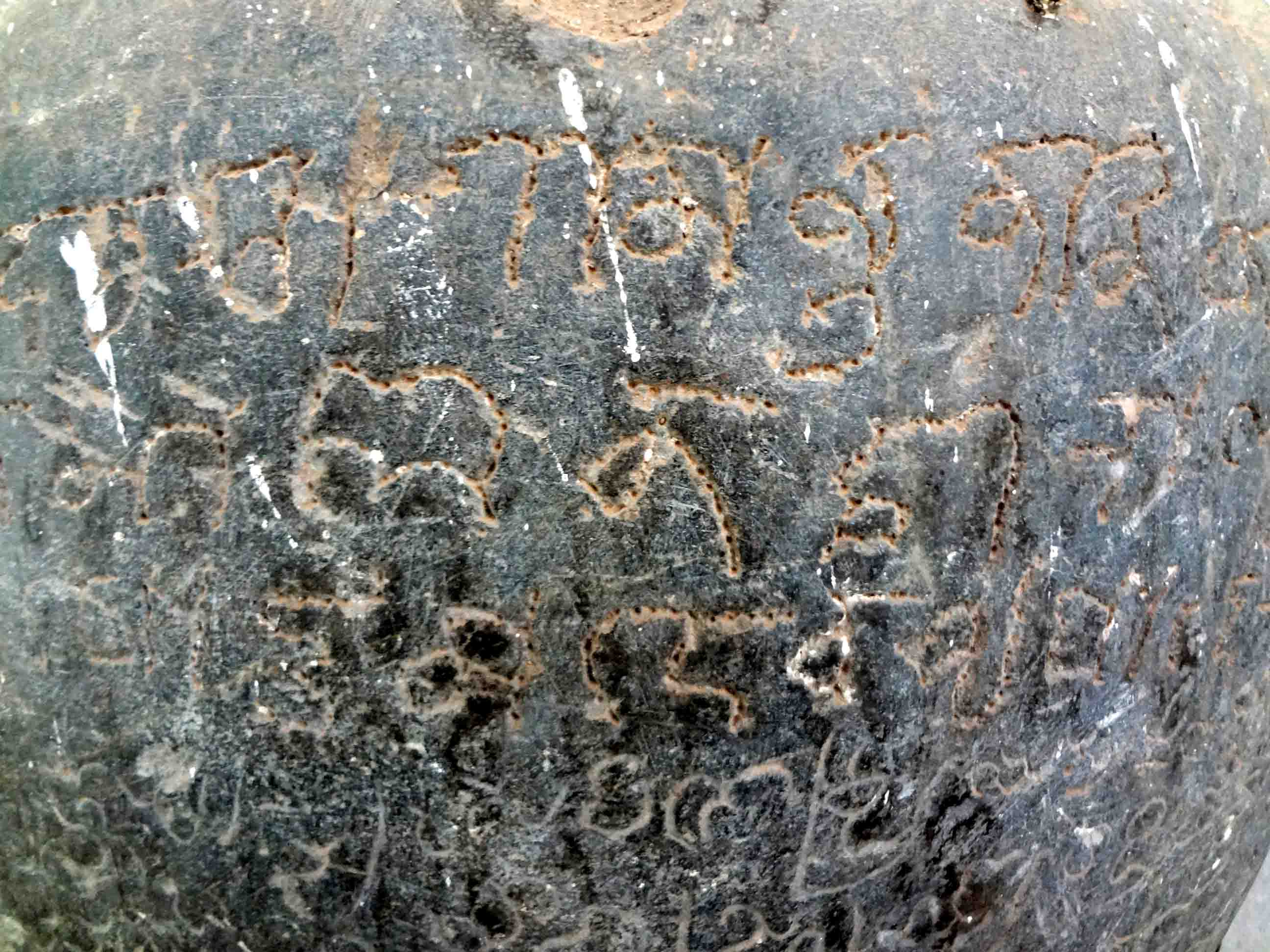
Bi language Inscription Bhubaneswar 8th Century AD

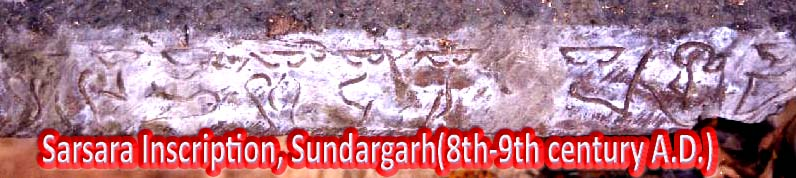
Sarsara Inscription, Sundargarh(8th-9th century)

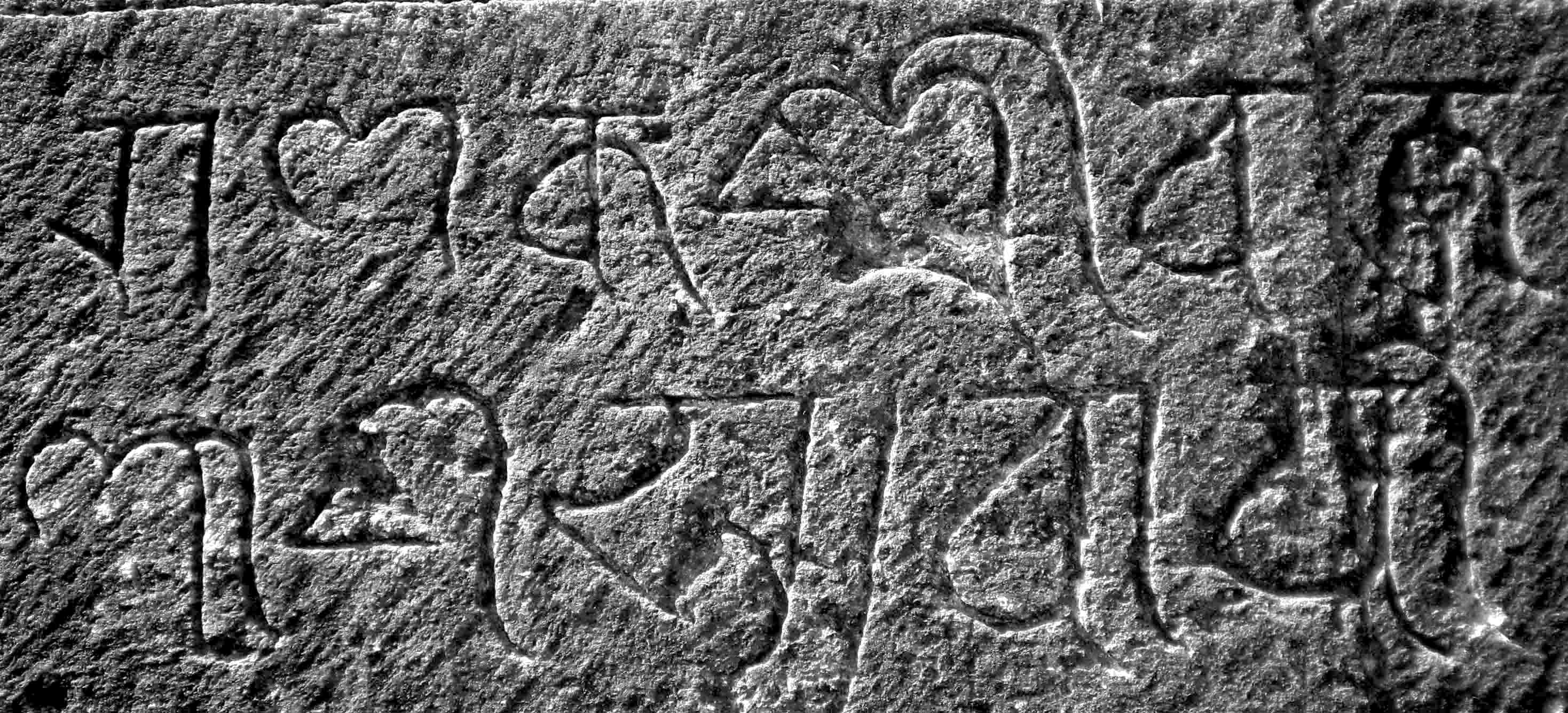
Ratnagiri Inscription, Jajpur (8th-9th century)

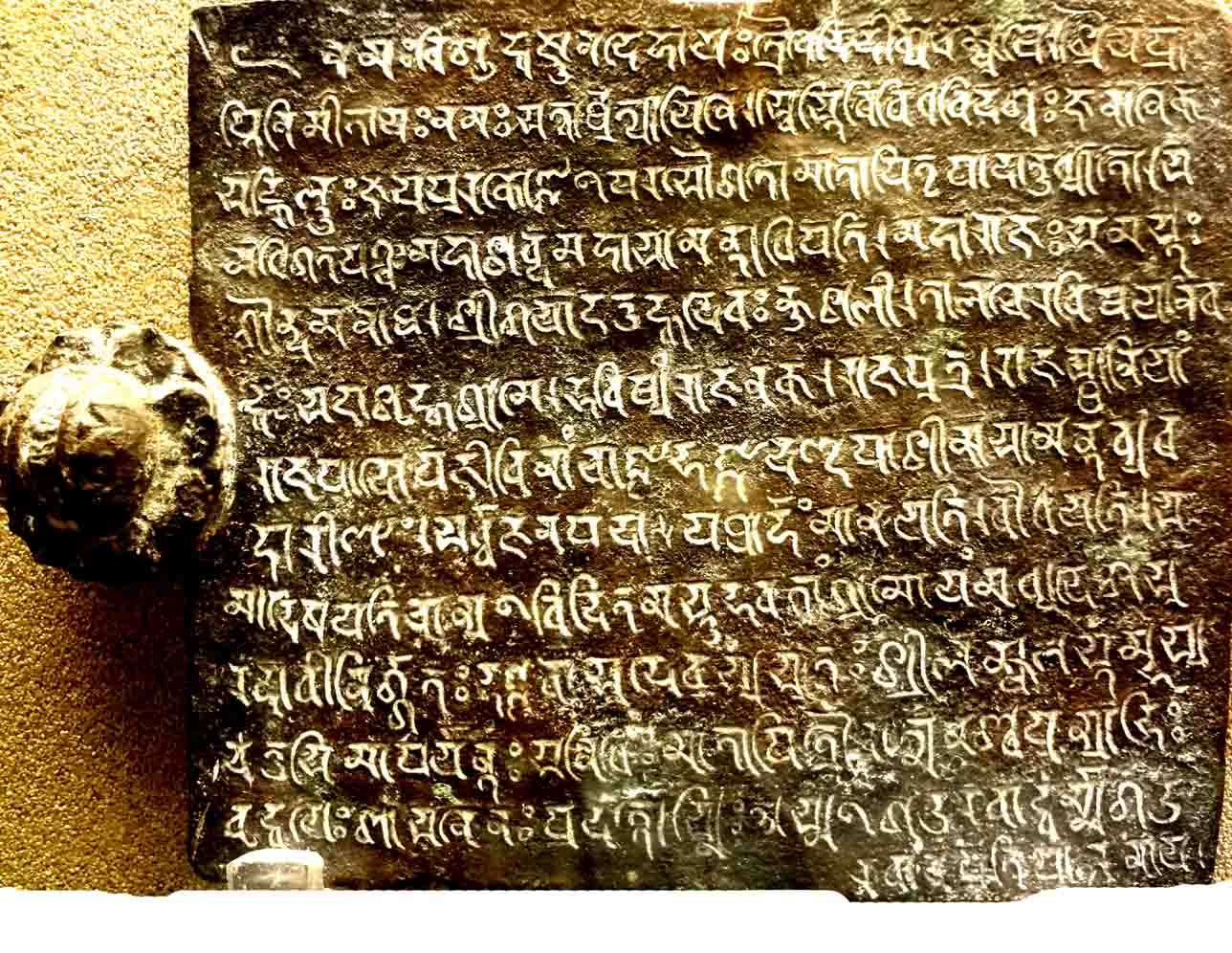
Gatarei Grant of Gayadtung -Dhankal-10th century AD

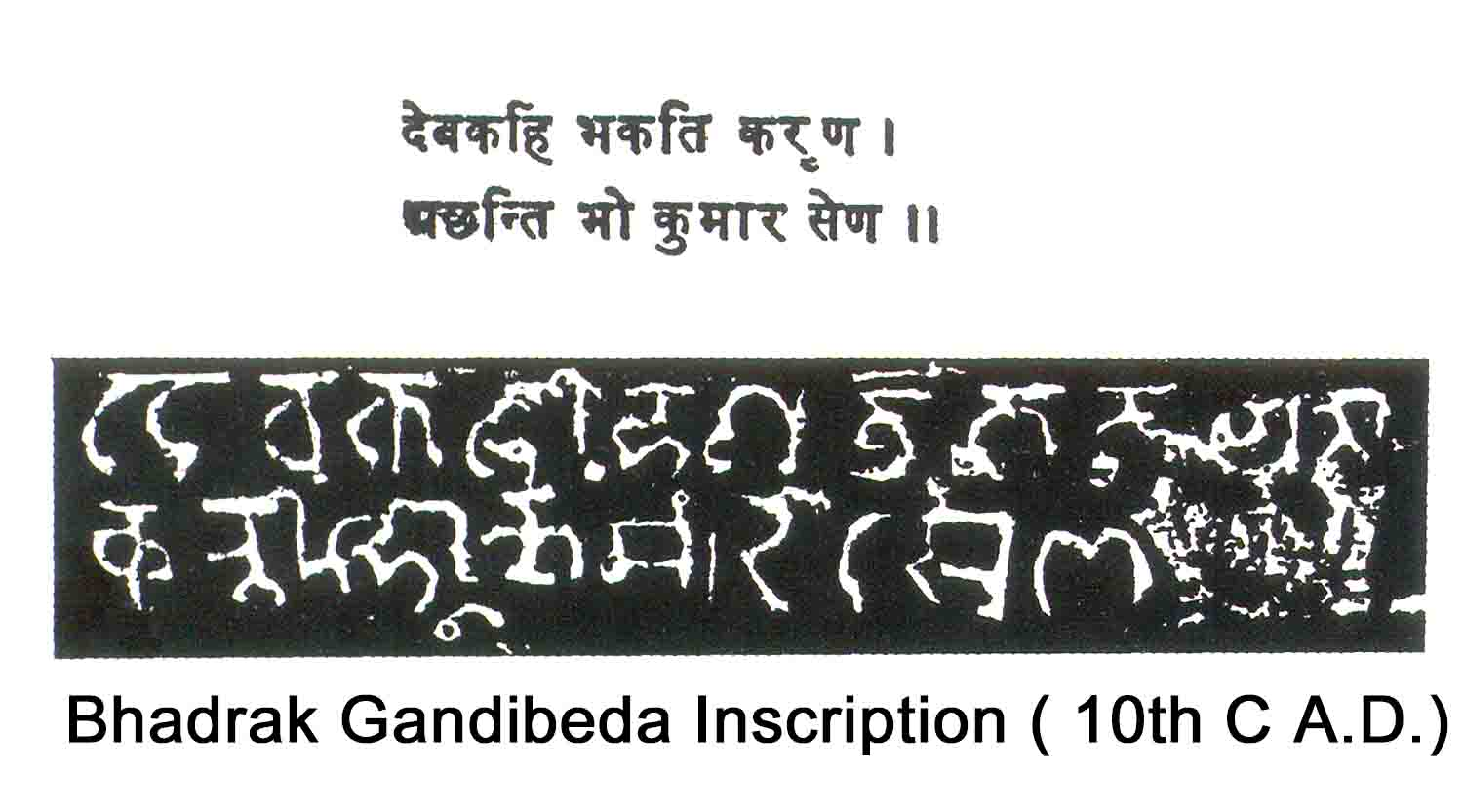
Gandibeda Inscription, Bhadrak (10th CE)

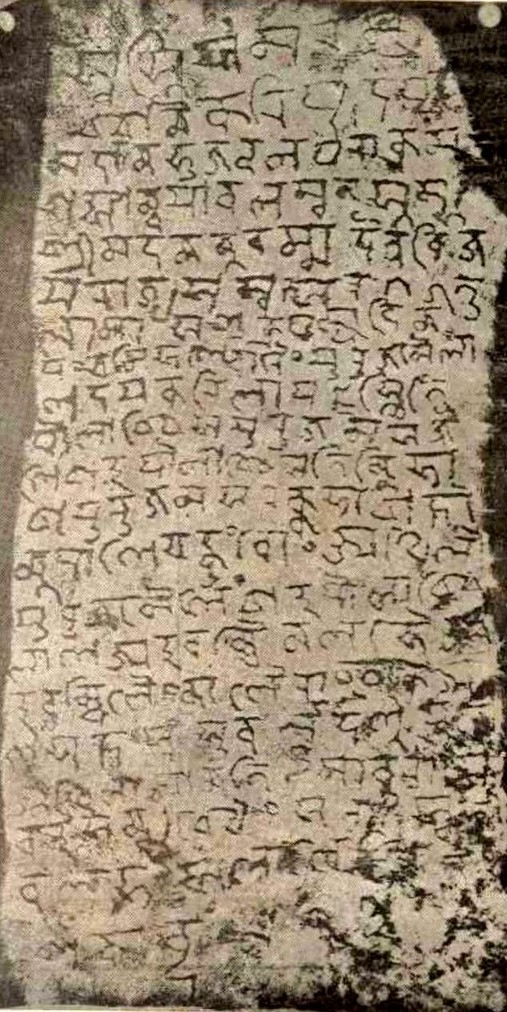
Urajam inscription in Old Odia in Kalinga script, royal charter of Eastern Ganga dynasty (1051 CE)

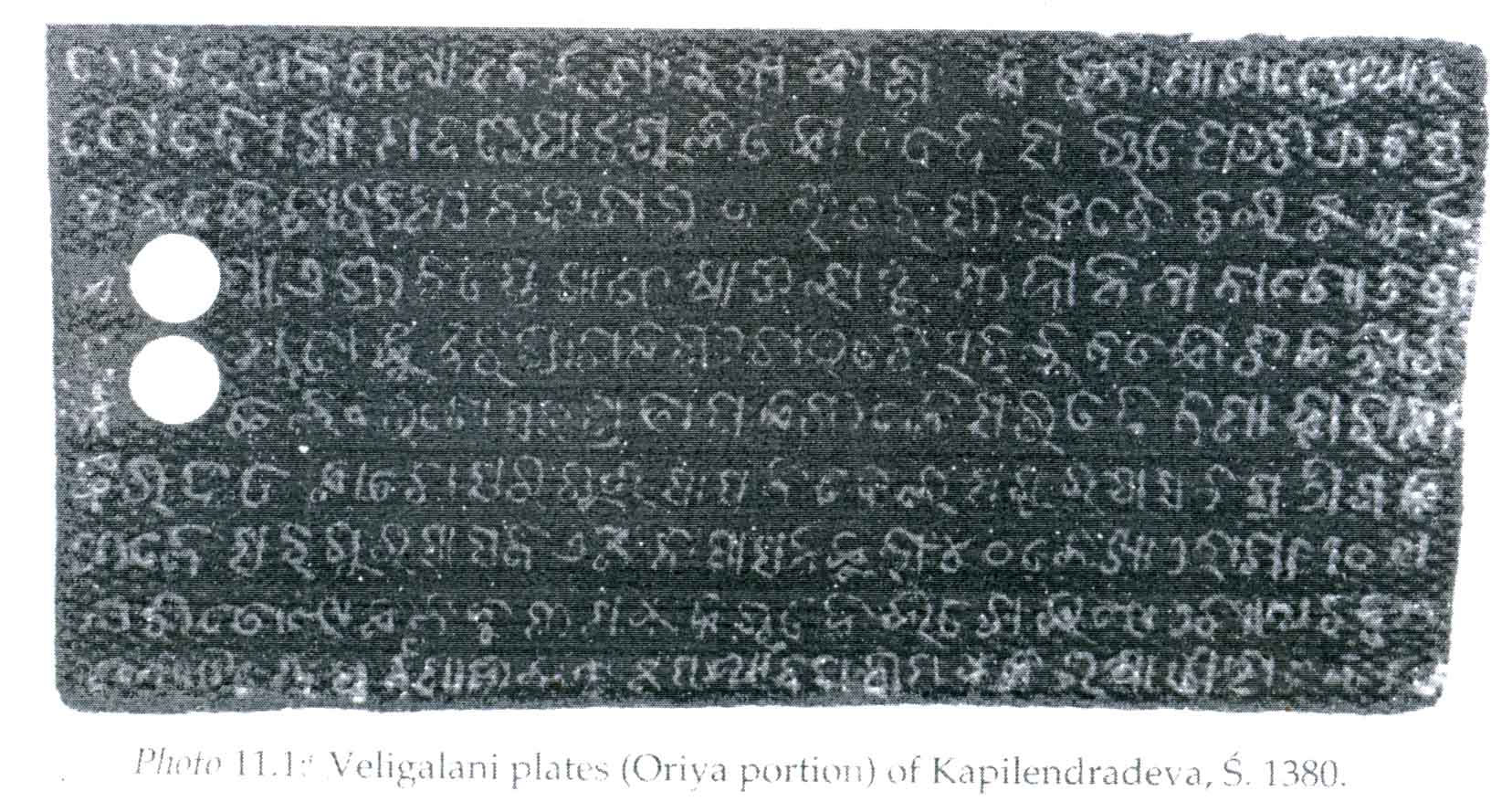
Kapilendra Dev Inscription (15th C AD)
