= Nagas of Vindhyatabi =

Royal dynasty ruling over Northern Odisha

- c. 261–c. 340 CE
- Capital: Vindhyatavi
- Common languages: Sanskrit; Prakrit
- Religion: Shaivism (Hinduism)
- Government: Monarchy
- Maharaja, Ranaslaghin
- History
  - Established: c. 261
  - Disestablished: c. 340 CE
Preceded by	Succeeded by
Murunda dynasty; Kushanas?	Gupta Empire; Bhanjas
- Today part of: India

The Nagas of Vindhyatabi were a royal dynasty ruling over Northern Odisha during the 2nd century A.D to 4th century A.D (possibly between 261 A.D to 340 A.D) from their seat at Vindhyatabi, also called Vindhyatavi (identified with modern-day Keonjhar).

== History ==
This dynasty was probably a branch of the Naga house, from which many rulers were descended and who ruled many kingdoms and principalities for the short duration between the fall of the Kushan Empire and the rise of the Gupta Empire. A ruler of this dynasty, Manabhanja with title of Maharaja, "had added to his glory in a hundred clashes in war with the Devaputras". The Devaputras mentioned here are obviously the Kushanas. This suggests that the Nagas of Vindhyatabi joined hands with confederation of Indian rulers, led by the Bharashiva Nagas to overthrow the Kushan rule in India.

Satrubhanja was the greatest and most powerful ruler of this dynasty. He was the son of Maharaja Manabhanja and his queen Mahadevi Damayanti. He distributed a huge amount of wealth around a large part of northern, central and eastern India which provides an image of his territorial expanse.

== Decline ==
Almost no Naga rulers of Vindhyatabi are known after Satrubhanja. Sitabhinji in Keonjhar district of Odisha has revealed that it was an ancient holy place of Shaivism promoted by the Naga rulers of Keonjhar as the cave arts found there provide a glimpse of a possible descendant of Satrubhanja who went by the name Disabhanja.

The Bhanjas emerged as leading chieftains succeeding the Nagas of the Vindhyatabi in the Kendujhar and Western Odisha region, inheriting their territories.
