= Murunda dynasty =

Indian Dynasty

- c. 2nd century CE–c. 3rd century CE
- Find spots and places of issue of the Murunda inscriptions
- Religion: Jainism
- Government: Monarchy
- Historical era: Classical India
  - Established: c. 2nd century CE
  - Disestablished: c. 3rd century CE
Preceded by	Succeeded by
Mahameghavahana dynasty	Gupta Empire

The Murunda dynasty ruled in the Utkal region of modern Odisha in eastern India during 2nd and 3rd centuries CE. Their territory included parts of the area around the northern districts of coastal Odisha. They appear to have succeeded the Mahameghavahana dynasty and then replaced by Nagas of Vindhyatabi and the Gupta Empire.

== Rulers ==
The following members of the Murunda family are known:

- Gana (2nd cen CE)
- Dhamadamadhara (Dharmatamadharasya) (3rd cen CE)

== History ==
The Murunda dynasty likely ruled Utkala around the 2nd century and 3rd century CE.

=== Gana ===
Much of the information about King Gana is known from the Bhadrak inscription which was issued in the 8th regnal year during his reign. The inscription was found near Bhadrakali Temple which brought there from the neighbouring village. The language of the inscription is in Prakrit written in Middle or Kushana Brahmi script. The inscription refers to the land grant given by Maharaja Gana to the residents of Panida.

=== Dhamadamadhara ===
Dhamadamadhara ruled over the region in around 3rd century CE. Under his reign, it has been noted that there were important diplomatic relations between Kalinga and Funan. The Funan kingdom was co-founded by the merchant Kaundinya I from Kalinga when he married the Funanese princess Soma. During 3rd cen CE, King Dhamadamadhara (Dharmatamadharasya) received the envoy Su-Wu representing King Fan Chan of Funan (225-250 CE) at the port of Tamralipti. Dhamadamadhara's rule over Kalinga is also attested from the discovery of a gold coin from Sisupalgarh, on whose obverse his name has been inscribed. The king presented the envoy Su-Wu with four horses and it quite likely there were strong trade and cultural interactions between the two kingdoms.

== Religion ==
In Odisha, Jainism continued to flourish after the Kharavela era, particularly under the Murunda dynasty and later local rulers. Archaeological evidence includes the later medieval caves at Khandagiri (Cuttack district) and the Jain temple complexes at Subai, (Koraput district).
