= Satrubhanja =

- Ranaslaghin
- Reign: fl. c. 261 CE – c. 340 CE
- Successor: Disabhanja
- House: Naga Clan of Vindhyatabi
- Father: Maharaja Manabhanja
- Mother: Mahadevi Damayanti

Satrubhanja (Odia : ଶତ୍ରୁଭଞ୍ଜ) was a king who belonged to the Vindhyatabi branch of Nagavanshi rulers that ruled from Keonjhar district of Odisha in the early 4th century CE (possibly between 261 CE to 340 CE). The era of Satrubhanja belongs to the pre Gupta rise as an imperial power in India when the other ruling of India joined hands with his leadership to overthrow the ruling Devaputras of Pataliputra, also otherwise known as Kushan rulers to the modern historians. The Asanapat village dancing Nataraja Shiva inscription in Sanskrit Language with Post Brahmi or early Kalinga script of Satrubhanja provides a great deal of details about his achievements as a conqueror and spiritual man. The inscription is of thirteen lines which is written partly in verse and partly in prose.

== Naga rule in Odisha ==
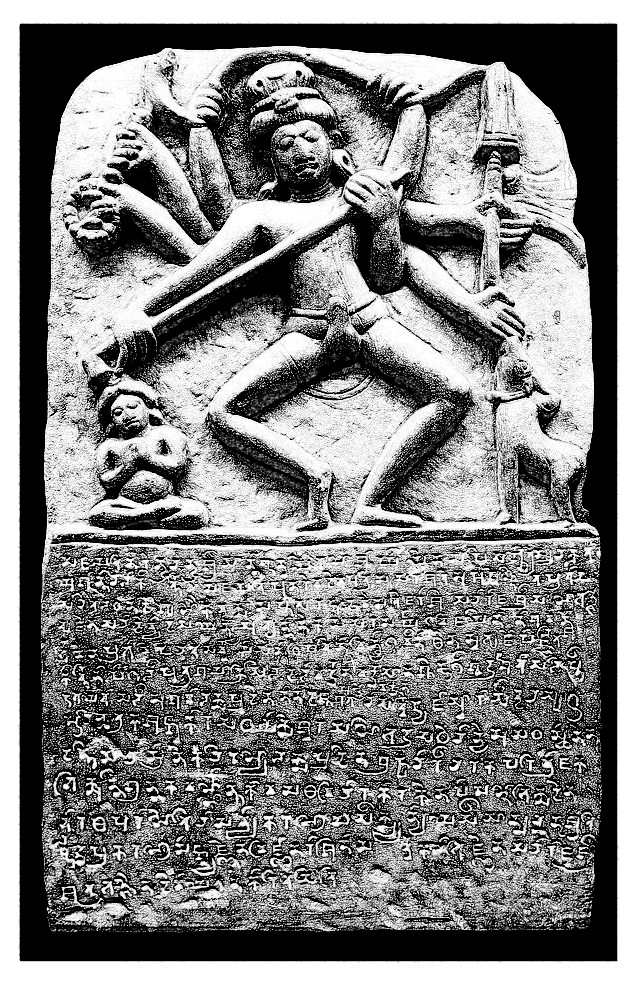
The Sketch of the Thirteen line Inscription of Satrubhanja from Asanpat in Odisha

The Naga clan ruled most of central and northern India during the 2nd Century A.D to 4th Century A.D. From the Asanpat inscription we know that Satrubhanja belonged to the part of this clan which ruled northern and western Odisha from Vindhyatabi which is identified as Keonjhar. The Nagas were a prevalent force in this part of Odisha while the kusana ruled as a prevailing power of the north india region. Successively the Murundas were overthrown by the Nagas in the same era as the Kushan power was also brought down.

== Asanpat inscription ==
The Asanpat inscription which is now kept in the Odisha state museum gives a detailed overview of Satrubhanja's life as ruler and warrior. He is described as born like moon among kings in the Naga clan and as the distinguished Ranaslaghin (one who boasts of battle), an epithet given to Bhishma in the Mahabharata. He is also described as a divine child born to a family the fame of which would last till the end of the Kali yuga. Probably he belonged to a very high class Naga clan family and according to the inscription was expected to win battles with the enemies in the future. Satrubhanja is described as the ruler of Vindhyatabi (Keonjhar and adjoining modern Mayurbhanj - Singhbhum districts). He was the son of Maharaja Manabhanja and the queen Mahadevi Damayanti. He was a successful warrior who is defined by the statement that his heroism remains unchallenged even after hundreds of battles with the Kushans. He is described as the Kalpavriksha who possessed the quality of good wealth on earth similar to the sun having mass splendor on earth.

=== Satrubhanja's personality ===
The inscription describes Satrubhanja’s knowledge in the Puranas and Mahabharata. He is mentioned to have mastered the knowledge of Itihasa, Vyakarana, Samiksa, Nyaya, Mimamsa, Chandas, Vedas, Buddhist Scriptures and Samkhya and also described as the expert in all arts. Satrubhanja had built monasteries and residences for spiritual men from different religious communities in his empire. The religious communities patronized by him included Brahmacharis, Parivrajakas or Jains, Bhikshus and Nirgranthakas of Buddhist religion. Towards the end of the inscription it also notes down that he had built a large temple for the Hindu deity, Shiva. Broken burnt bricks and rubble of an ancient structure are found in the Asanpat area believed by many scholars to be the remnants of this temple.

== The extent of Satrubhanja's empire ==
The struggle of the combined Naga forces (Kausambi, Ahichhatra, Padmavati and Vindhyatavi) caused the downfall of the Kushan power in India leading to the rise of the Gupta supremacy. Satrubhanja had gifted lakhs of cows at places like Pataliputra, Gaya, Krimila, Dalavardhana, Pundravardhana, Gokkhati, Khadranga, Tamaralipti and both North and South Toshali with the purpose of to united of local rulers and defeated to Debaputra or kusana king biswa sphani. He had donated gold coins to various monasteries such as the Sankhara Matha at Ahichatra (Ramnagar in Uttarakhand) and Manibhadra matha at Yaksheswara. These mention of the areas in a period of conflict between the rising Gupta and prevailing Naga dynasties, clearly indicates that they were controlled by Satrubhanja and he dictated authority over them. Satrubhanja was called the lord of Vindhyatavi. The Mathara rulers in the Toshali region in coastal Odisha and parts of Andhra today are assumed to have contributed to the process of elimination of the Kushans in the region completely while Satrubhanja was directly confronting them over a larger extent.

He distributed a huge amount of wealth around a large part of northern, central and eastern India which provides an image of his territorial expanse. After the downfall of the Kushans, the Naga and Guptas locked in conflict to become the supreme power in the subcontinent. Samudragupta completely subjugated the Naga forces in the Aryavrat wars which confirms that the Nagas and Guptas were competing powers in India after the defeat of the Kushan rulers. Though the Naga clan was defeated after its short lived rise to supremacy, they were instrumental in overthrowing the rule of foreign origin Kushans in India. Sitabhinji in Keonjhar district of Odisha has revealed that it was an ancient holy place of Shaivism promoted by the Naga - Bhanja rulers as the cave arts found there provide a glimpse of a possible descendant of Satrubhanja who went by the name Disabhanja. Nagas survived the wars with the Guptas and surfaced scarcely on many occasions throughout the history of Odisha and rest of eastern India.
