= Gupta art =

Art of the Gupta Empire

Gupta art

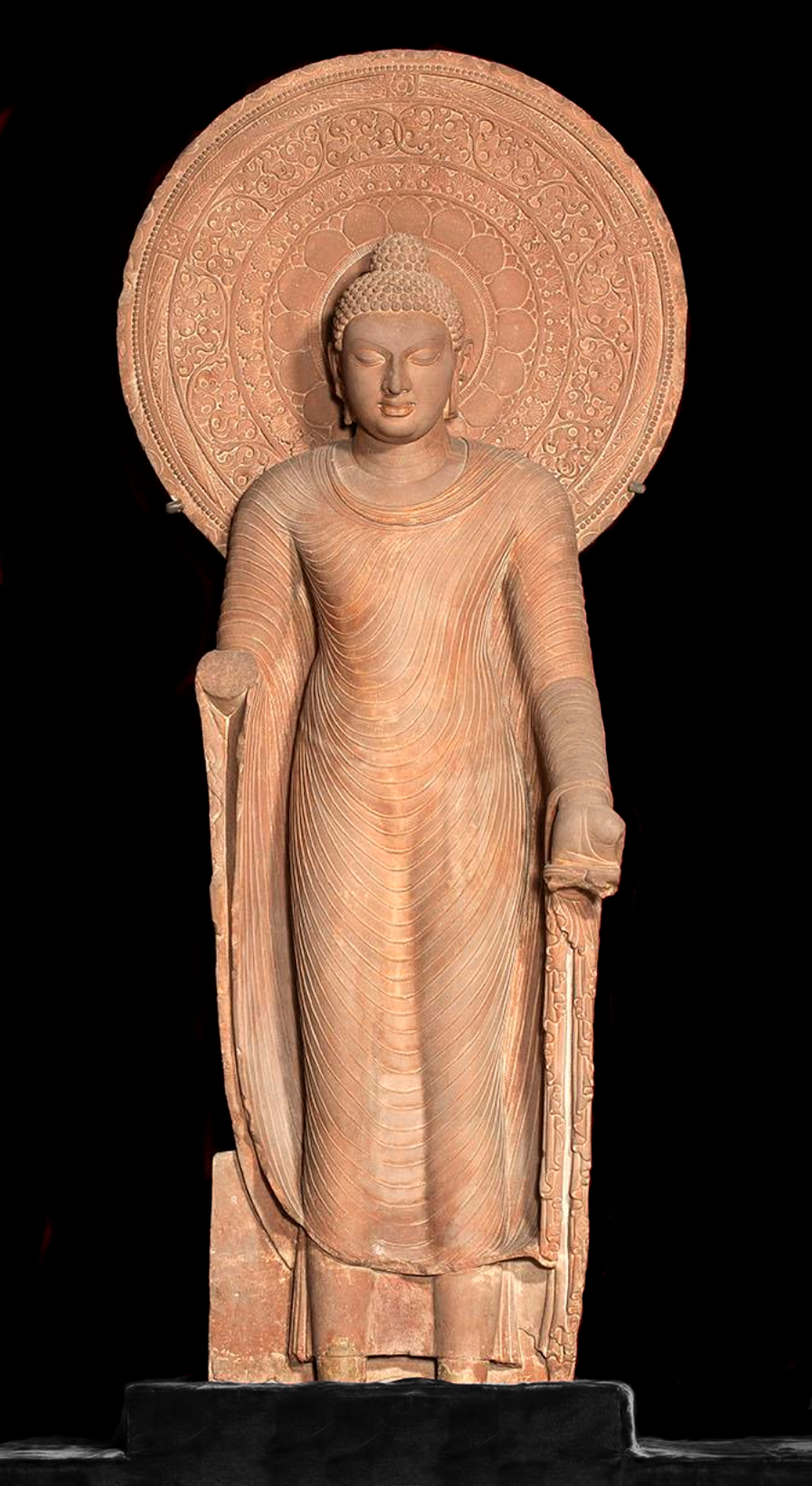
Standing Buddha of the art of Mathura. Gupta Empire period, circa 5th century CE. Rashtrapati Bhavan Presidential Palace, New Delhi, India.

The three main schools of Gupta art were located in Mathura, Varanasi and Nalanda.

Gupta art is the art of the Gupta Empire, which ruled most of northern India, with its peak between about 300 and 480 CE, surviving in much reduced form until c. 550. The Gupta period is generally regarded as a classic peak and golden age of North Indian art for all the major religious groups. Gupta art is characterized by its "Classical decorum", in contrast to the subsequent Indian medieval art, which "subordinated the figure to the larger religious purpose".

Although painting was evidently widespread, the surviving works are almost all religious sculpture. The period saw the emergence of the iconic carved stone deity in Hindu art, while the production of the Buddha-figure and Jain tirthankara figures continued to expand, the latter often on a very large scale. The traditional main centre of sculpture was Mathura, which continued to flourish, with the art of Gandhara, the centre of Greco-Buddhist art just beyond the northern border of Gupta territory, continuing to exert influence. Other centres emerged during the period, especially at Sarnath. Both Mathura and Sarnath exported sculpture to other parts of northern India.

It is customary to include under "Gupta art" works from areas in north and central India that were not actually under Gupta control, in particular art produced under the Vakataka dynasty who ruled the Deccan c. 250–500. Their region contained very important sites such as the Ajanta Caves and Elephanta Caves, both mostly created in this period, and the Ellora Caves which were probably begun then. Also, although the empire lost its western territories by about 500, the artistic style continued to be used across most of northern India until about 550, and arguably around 650. It was then followed by the "Post-Gupta" period, with (to a reducing extent over time) many similar characteristics; Harle ends this around 950.

In general the style was very consistent across the empire and the other kingdoms where it was used. The vast majority of surviving works are religious sculpture, mostly in stone with some in metal or terracotta, and architecture, mostly in stone with some in brick. The Ajanta Caves are virtually the sole survival from what was evidently a large and sophisticated body of painting, and the very fine coinage the main survivals in metalwork. Gupta India produced both textiles and jewellery, which are only known from representations in sculpture and especially the paintings at Ajanta.

== Background ==
Gupta art was preceded by Kushan art, the art of the Kushan Empire in northern India, between the 1st and the 4th century CE and blended the tradition of the Greco-Buddhist art of Gandhara, influenced by Hellenistic artistic canons, and the more Indian art of Mathura. In Western India, as visible in Devnimori, the Western Satraps (1st–4th century CE) developed a refined art, representing a Western Indian artistic tradition that was anterior to the rise of Gupta art, and which may have influenced not only the latter, but also the art of the Ajanta Caves, Sarnath and other places from the 5th century onward. In central India, the art of the Satavahanas had already created a rich Indian artistic idiom, as visible in Sanchi, which also influenced Gupta art.

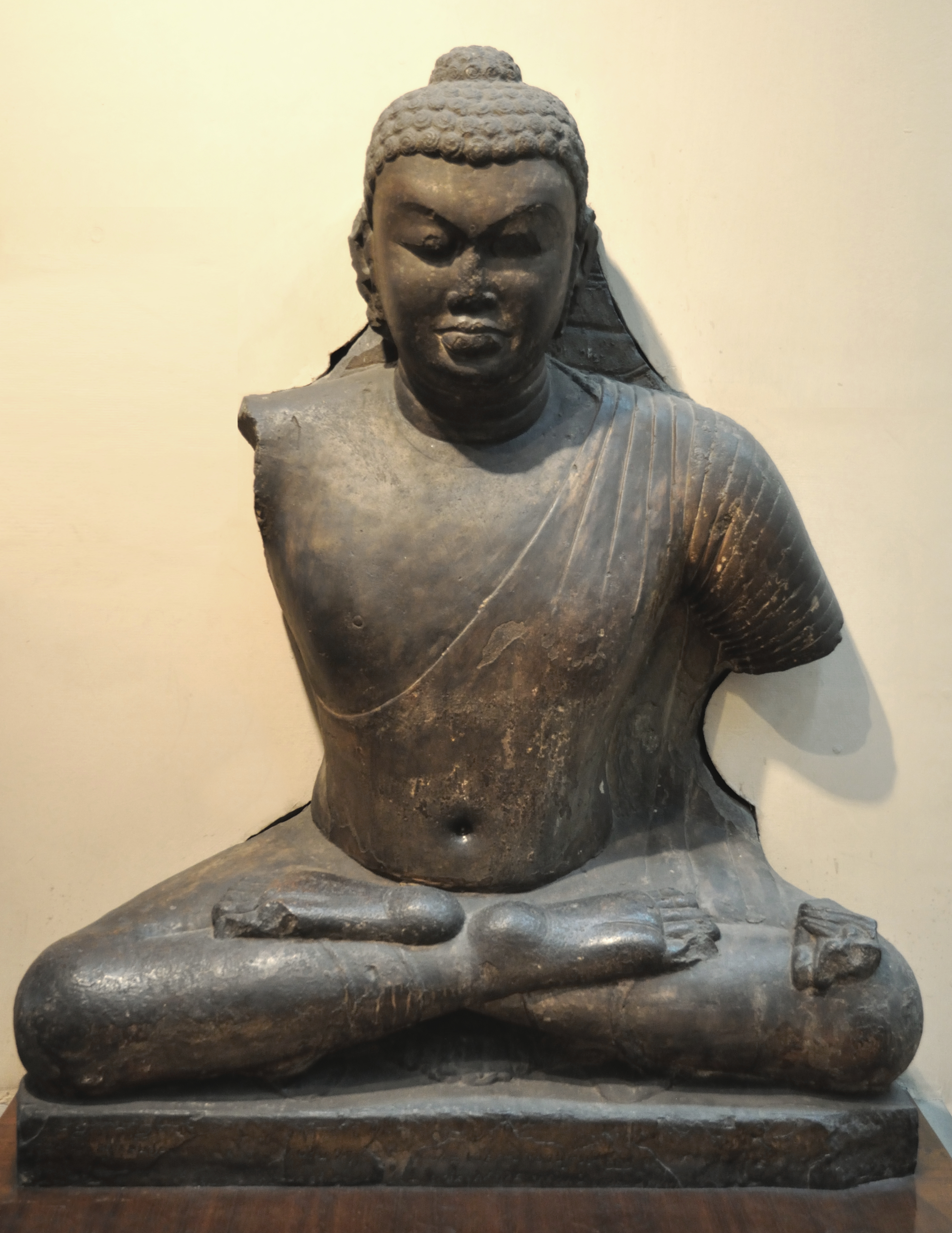
One of the earliest dated Gupta statues, a Bodhisattva derived from the Kushan style of Mathura art, inscribed "year 64" of the Gupta era, 384 CE, Bodh Gaya.

With the conquests of Samudragupta (r.c. 335/350-375 CE) and Chandragupta II (r.c. 380 – c. 415 CE), the Gupta Empire came to incorporate vast portions of central, northern and northwestern India, as far as the Punjab and the Arabian Sea, continuing and expanding on these earlier artistic traditions and developing a unique Gupta style, rising "to heights of sophistication, elegance and glory". Unlike some other Indian dynasties before and after them, and with the exception of the imagery on their coins, the Gupta imperial family did not advertise their relationship to the art produced under them by inscriptions, let alone portraits that have survived.

=== Early chronology ===
There are several pieces of statuary from the Gupta period which are inscribed with a date. They work as a benchmark for the chronology and the evolution of style under the Guptas. These Gupta statues are dated from the Gupta era (which starts in 318–319 CE), and sometimes mention the reigning ruler of that time. Besides statuary, coinage is also an important chronological indicator.

Although the Gupta Empire is reckoned to start after King Gupta in the late 3rd century CE, the earliest known and dated sculptures of Gupta art come relatively late, about a century later, after the conquest of northwestern India under Samudragupta. Among the earliest is an inscribed pillar recording the installation of two Shiva Lingas in Mathura in 380 CE under Chandragupta II, Samudragupta's successor. Another rare example is a statue of a seated Bodhisattva in the Mathura style with dhoti and shawl on the left shoulder, coming from Bodh Gaya and dated to "year 64", presumably of the Gupta era, thought to be 384 CE. This type remained a rare occurrence, as in most of the later Gupta statues the Buddha would be shown with the samghati monastic robe covering both shoulders.

Coinage too was a relatively late development, also consecutive to Samugragupta's conquest of the northwest. The Gupta coinage was initially in imitation of the Kushan types.

=== Style ===
The Gupta style of statuary, especially as seen in the Buddha images, is characterized by several formative traits: ornate halos with floral and gem motifs, clothes with thin diaphanous drapery, specific hair curls, meditative eyes, elongated earlobes, relatively thick lower lips, and often three lines across the neck.

== Sculpture ==
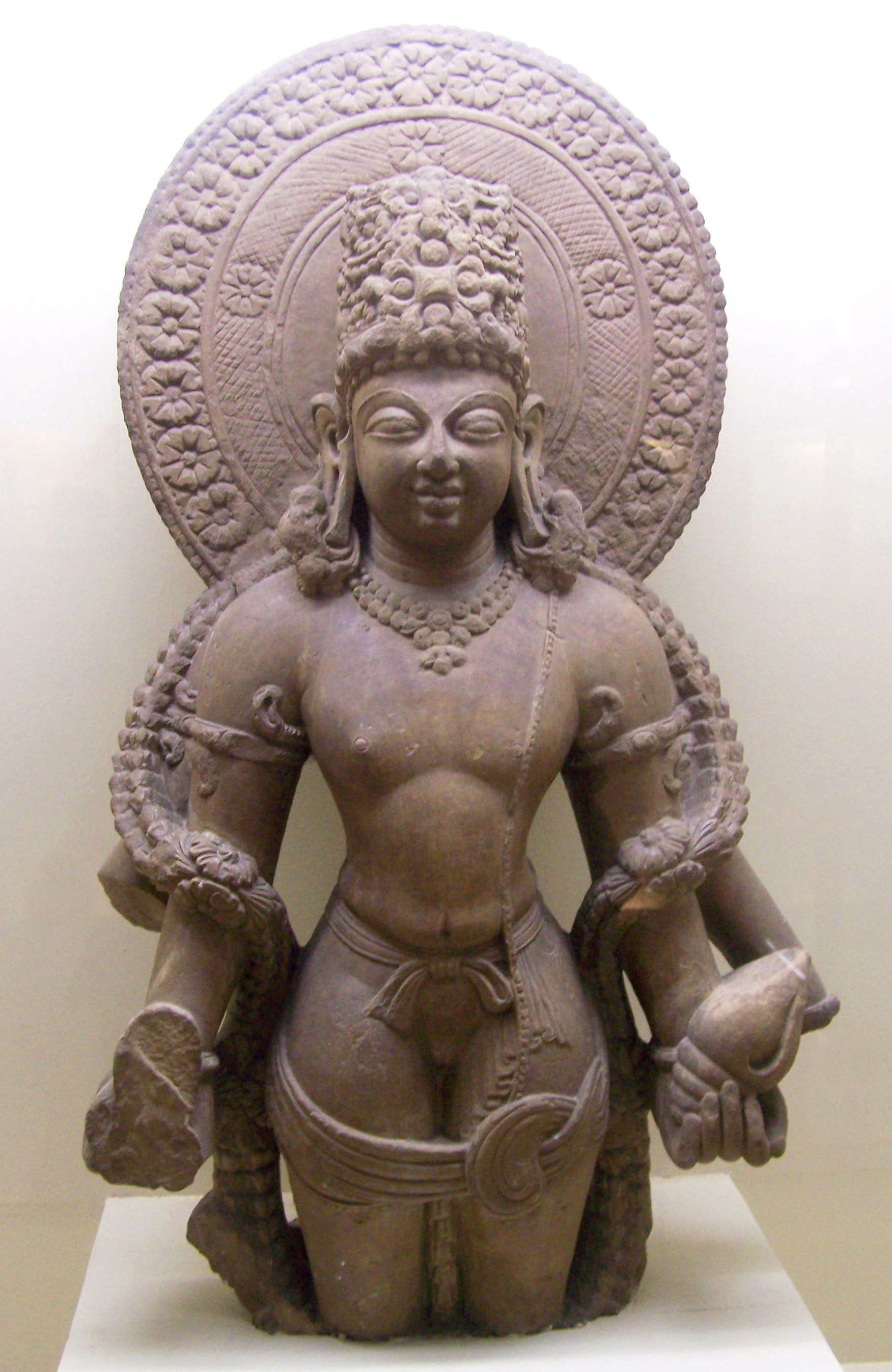
Vishnu, 5th century, Mathura

Three main schools of Gupta sculpture are often recognised, based in Mathura, Varanasi/Sarnath and to a lesser extent Nalanda. The distinctively different stones used for sculptures exported from the main centres described below aids identification greatly.

Both Hindu and Buddhist sculpture concentrate on large, often near life-size, figures of the major deities, respectively Vishnu, Shiva and Buddha. The dynasty had a partiality to Vishnu, who now features more prominently, where the Kushan imperial family generally had preferred Shiva. Minor figures such as yakshi, which had been very prominent in preceding periods, are now smaller and less frequently represented, and the crowded scenes illustrating Jataka tales of the Buddha's previous lives are rare. When scenes include one of the major figures and other less important ones, there is a great difference in scale, with the major figures many times larger. This is also the case in representations of incidents from the Buddha's life, which earlier had shown all the figures on the same scale.

The lingam was the central murti in most temples. Some new figures appear, including personifications of the Ganges and Yamuna rivers, not yet worshipped, but placed on either side of entrances; these were "the two great rivers encompassing the Gupta heartland". The main bodhisattva appear prominently in sculpture for the first time, as in the paintings at Ajanta. Hindu, Buddhist and Jain sculpture all show the same style, and there is a "growing likeness of form" between figures from the different religions, which continued after the Gupta period.

The Indian stylistic tradition of representing the body as a series of "smooth, very simplified planes" is continued, though poses, especially in the many standing figures, are subtly tilted and varied, in contrast to the "columnar rigidity" of earlier figures. The detail of facial parts, hair, headgear, jewellery and the haloes behind figures are carved very precisely, giving a pleasing contrast with the emphasis on broad swelling masses in the body. Deities of all the religions are shown in a calm and majestic meditative style; "perhaps it is this all-pervading inwardness that accounts for the unequalled Gupta and post-Gupta ability to communicate higher spiritual states".

=== Mathura school ===
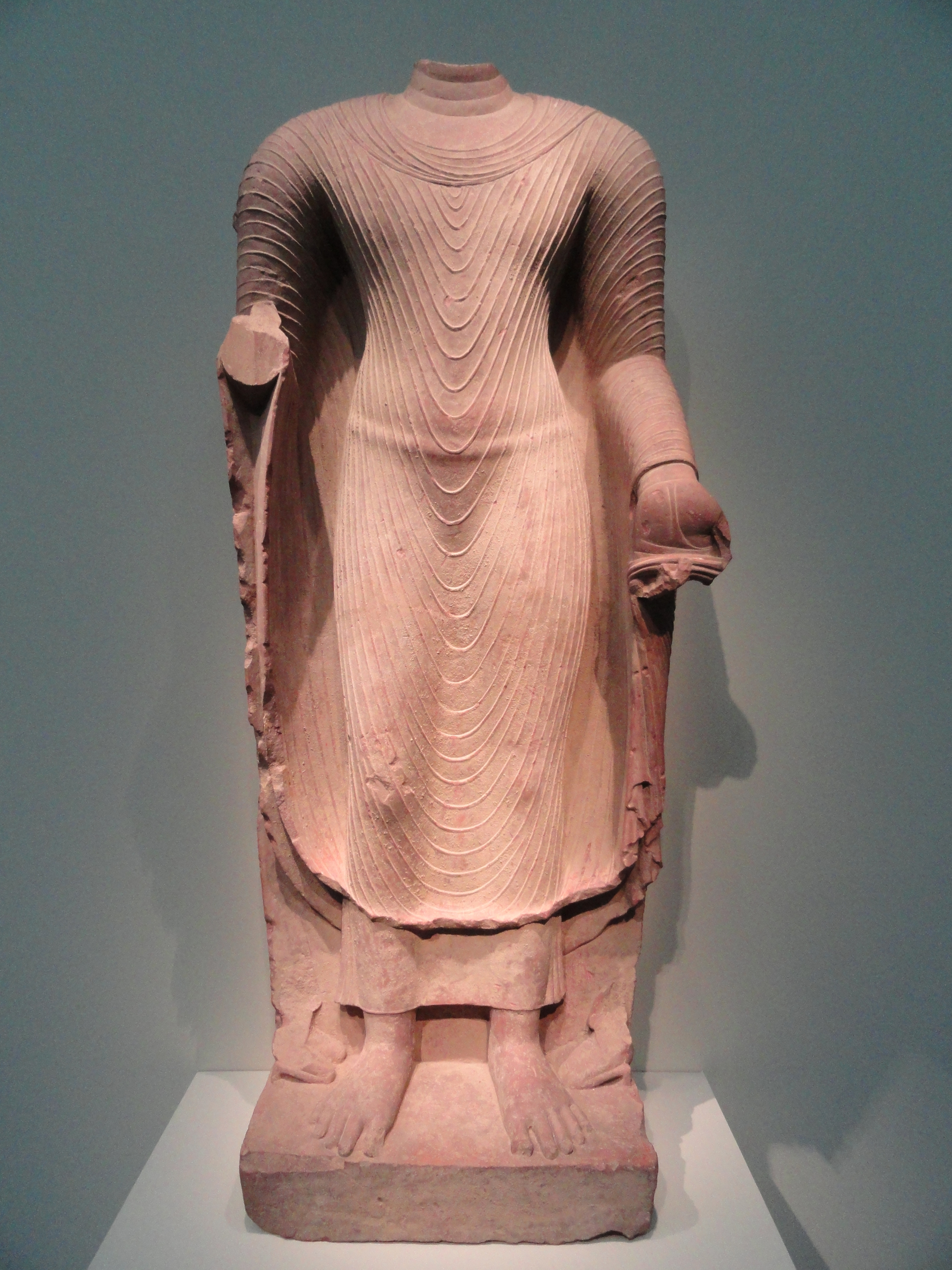
Standing Buddha, Mathura

The long-established Mathura school continued as one of the main two schools of Gupta Empire art, joined by the school of Varanasi and nearby Sarnath. Under the Guptas, Mathura remained primarily a center of Buddhist artistic activity and worship, but a few Hindu, especially Vaishnavite, sculptures started to appear. Mathura sculpture is characterized by its usage of mottled red stone from Karri in the district, and its foreign influences, continuing the traditions of the art of Gandhara and the art of the Kushans.

The art of Mathura continued to become more sophisticated during the Gupta Empire. The pink sandstone sculptures of Mathura evolved during the Gupta period to reach a very high fineness of execution and delicacy in the modeling, displaying calm and serenity. The style become elegant and refined, with a very delicate rendering of the draping and a sort of radiance reinforced by the usage of pink sandstone. Artistic details tend to be less realistic, as seen in the symbolic shell-like curls used to render the hairstyle of the Buddha, and the orante halos around the head of the Buddhas. The art of the Gupta is often considered as the pinnacle of Indian Buddhist art, achieving a beautiful rendering of the Buddhist ideal.

Gupta art is also characterized by an expansion of the Buddhist pantheon, with a high importance given to the Buddha himself and to new deities, including Bodhisattvas such as Avalokitesvara or divinities of Bramanical inspiration, and less focus on the events of the life of the Buddha which were abundantly illustrated through Jataka stories in the art of Bharhut and Sanchi (2nd–1st centuries BCE), or in the Greco-Buddhist art of Gandhara (1st–4th centuries CE).

The Gupta art of Mathura was very influential throughout northern India, accompanied by a reducing of foreign influences; its style can be seen in Gupta statues to the east in areas as far as Allahabad, with the Mankuwar Buddha, dated to the reign of Kumaragupta I in 448.

There are a number of "problematical" Buddhist and Jain images from Mathura whose dating is uncertain; many are dated with a low year number, but which era is being used is unclear. These may well come from the early Gupta period.

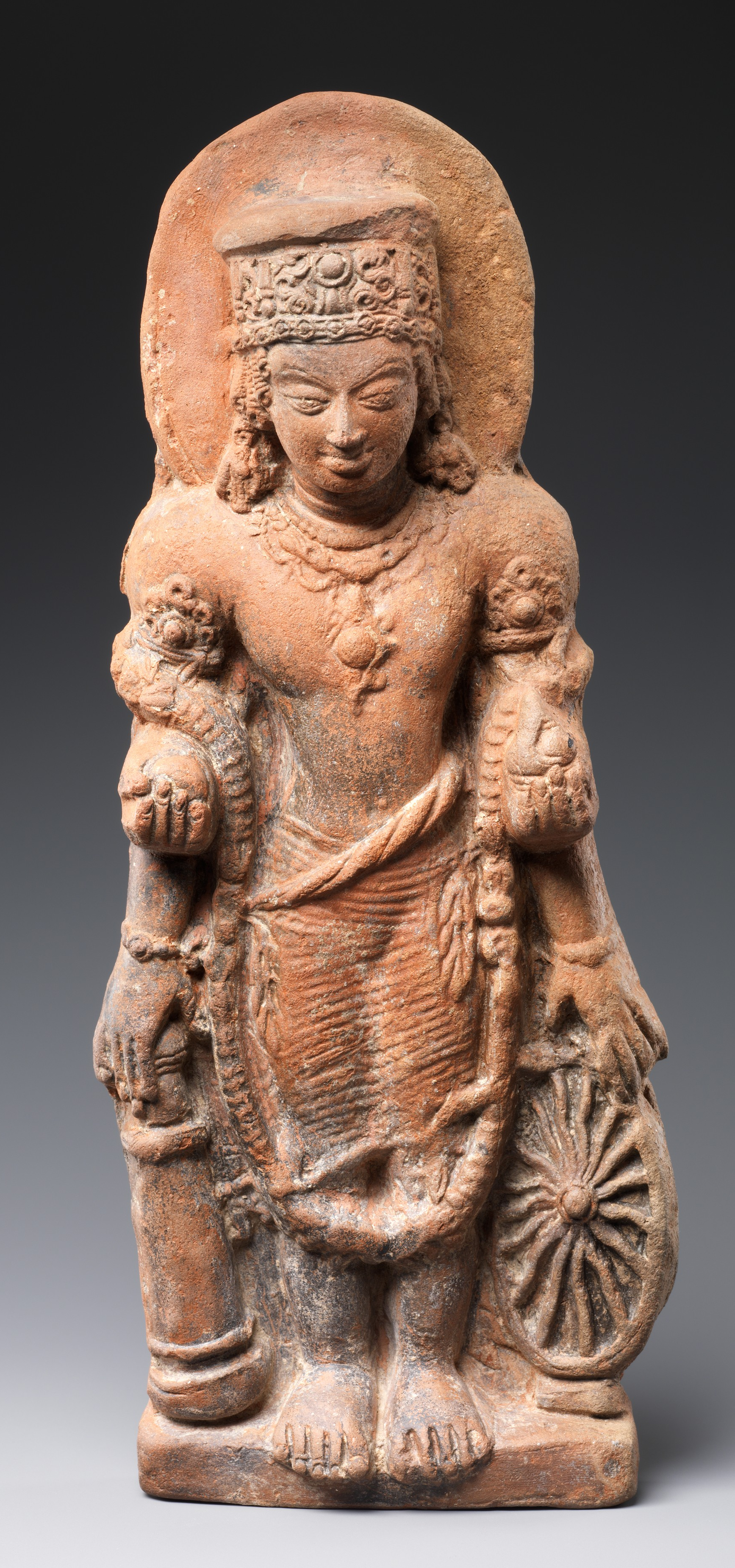
Vishnu holds the Kaumodaki in his lower right hand; 5th century.

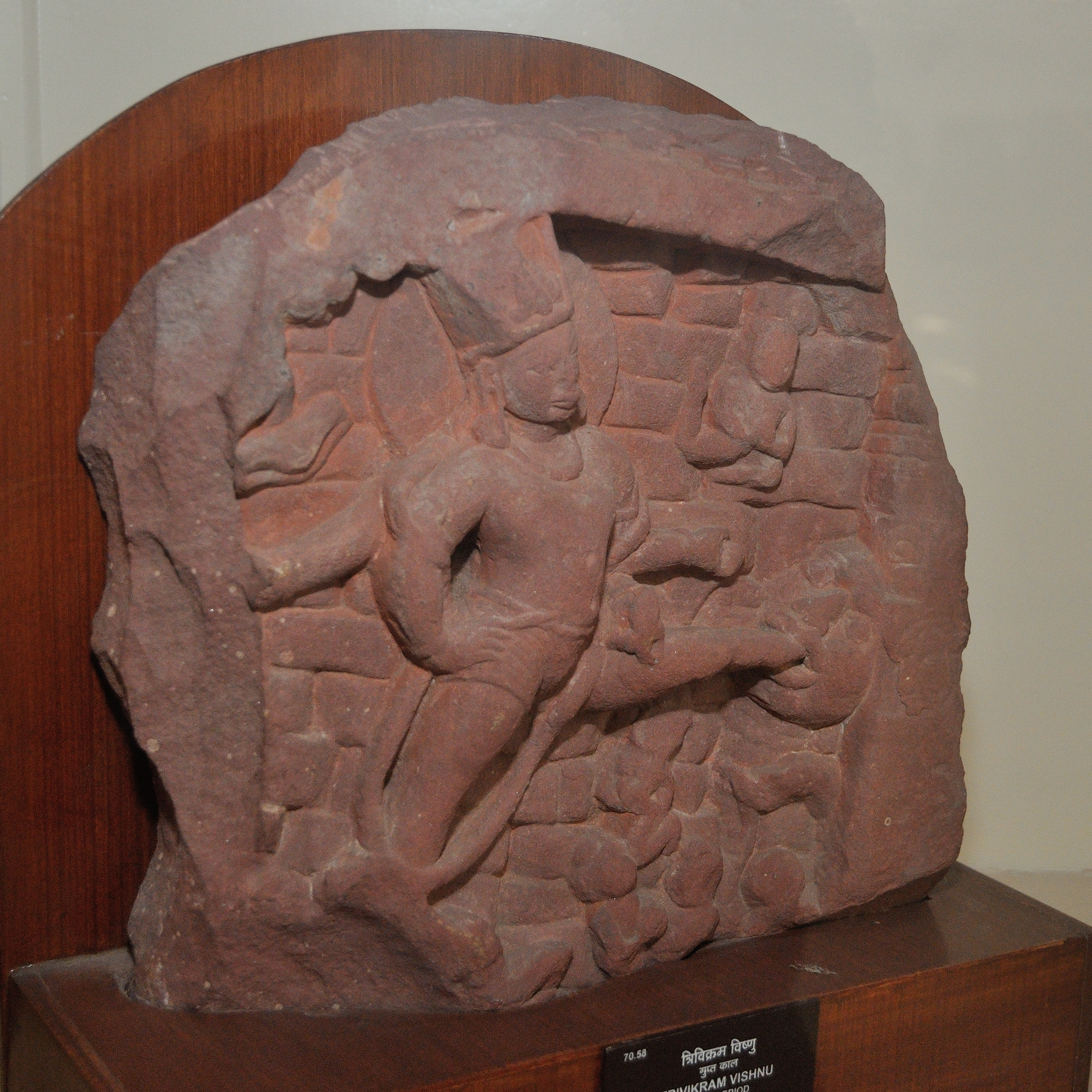
A relief of the Trivikrama , "three strides of Vishnu", in the art of Mathura during the Gupta period.

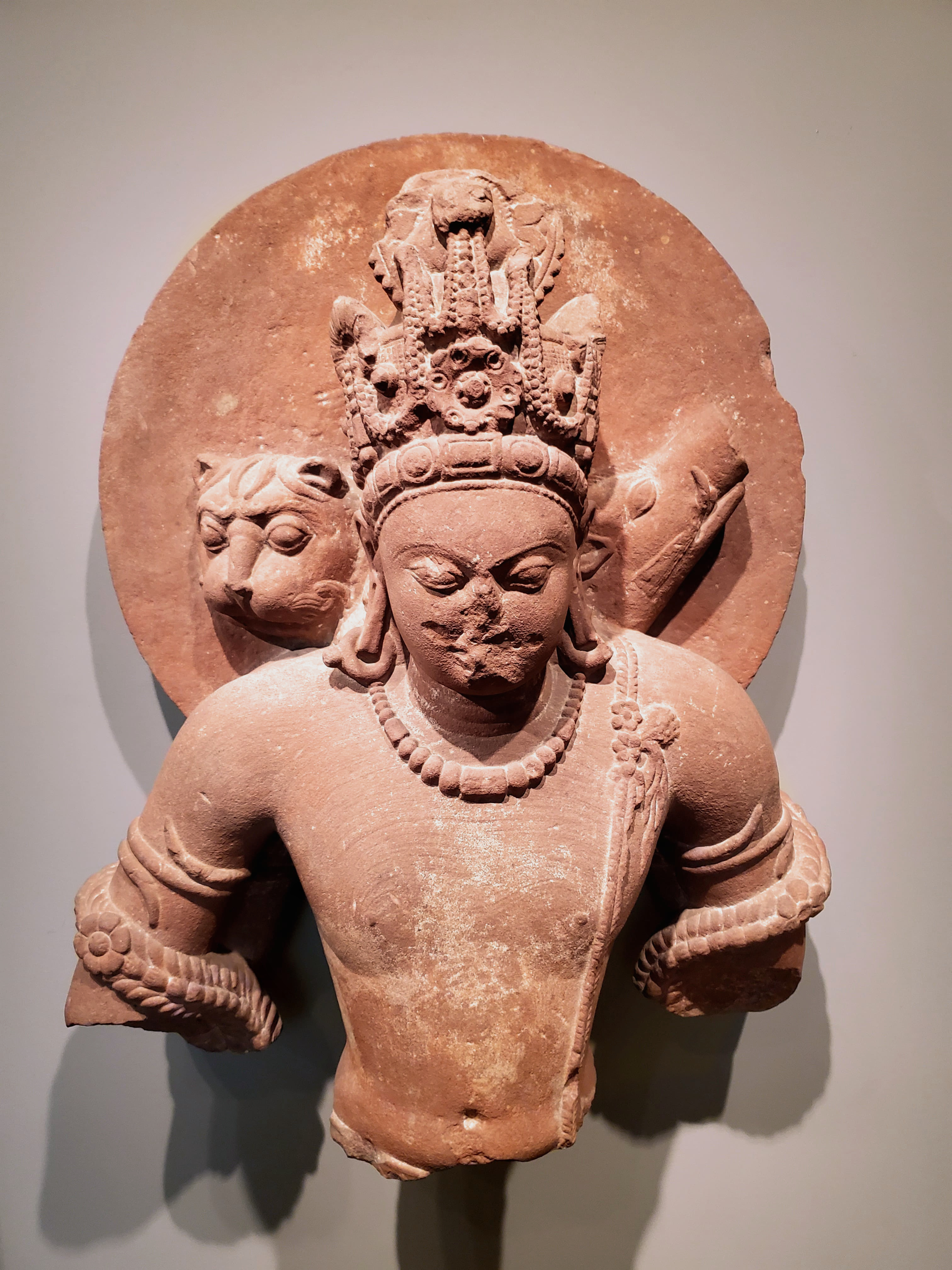
Vishnu in three incarnations (Chaturvyuha): Vishnu himself or Vāsudeva-Krishna in human form, Varaha as a boar, Narasimha as a lion. Mathura, mid-5th century CE. Boston Museum.

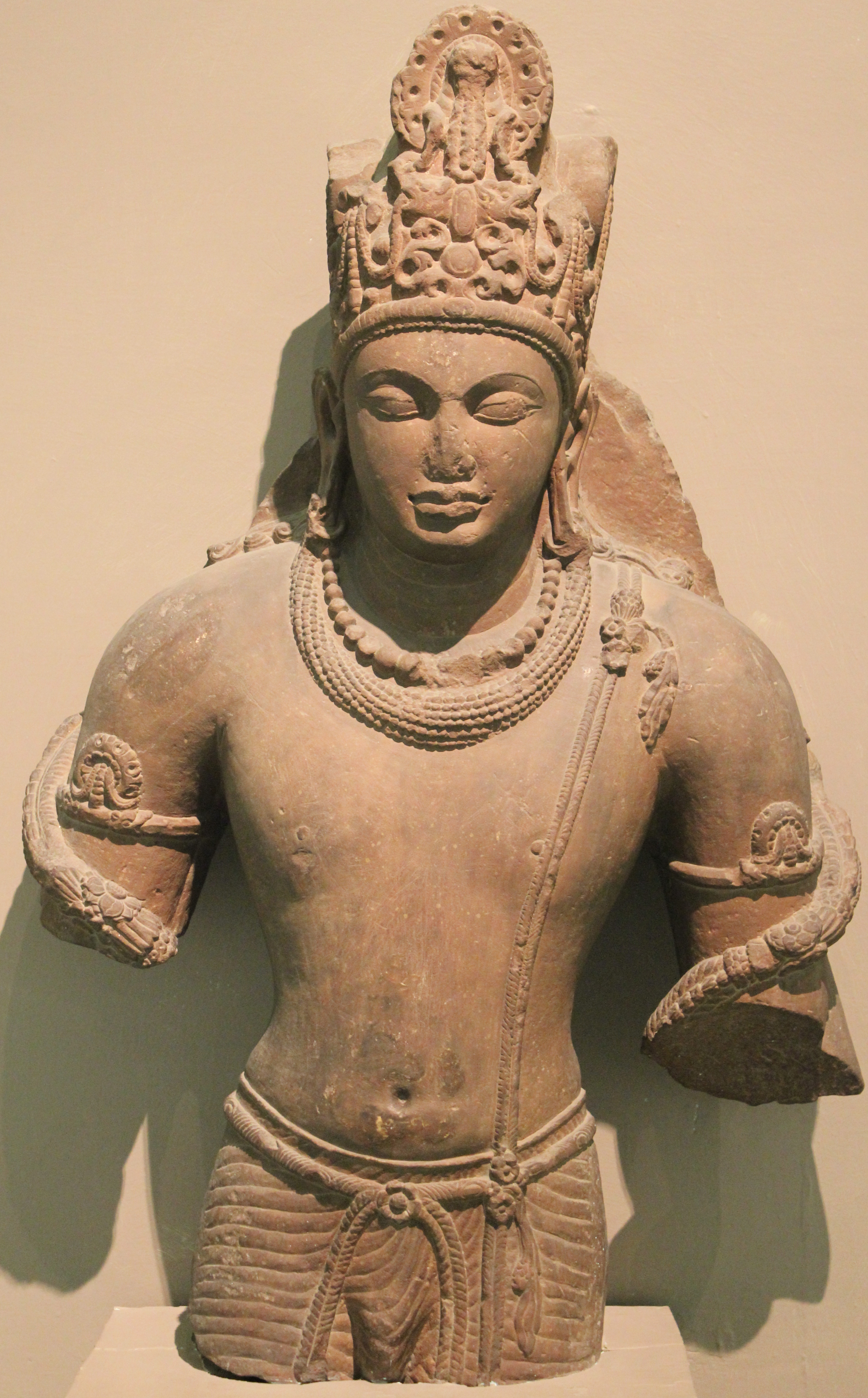
Vishnu, 5th century, Mathura

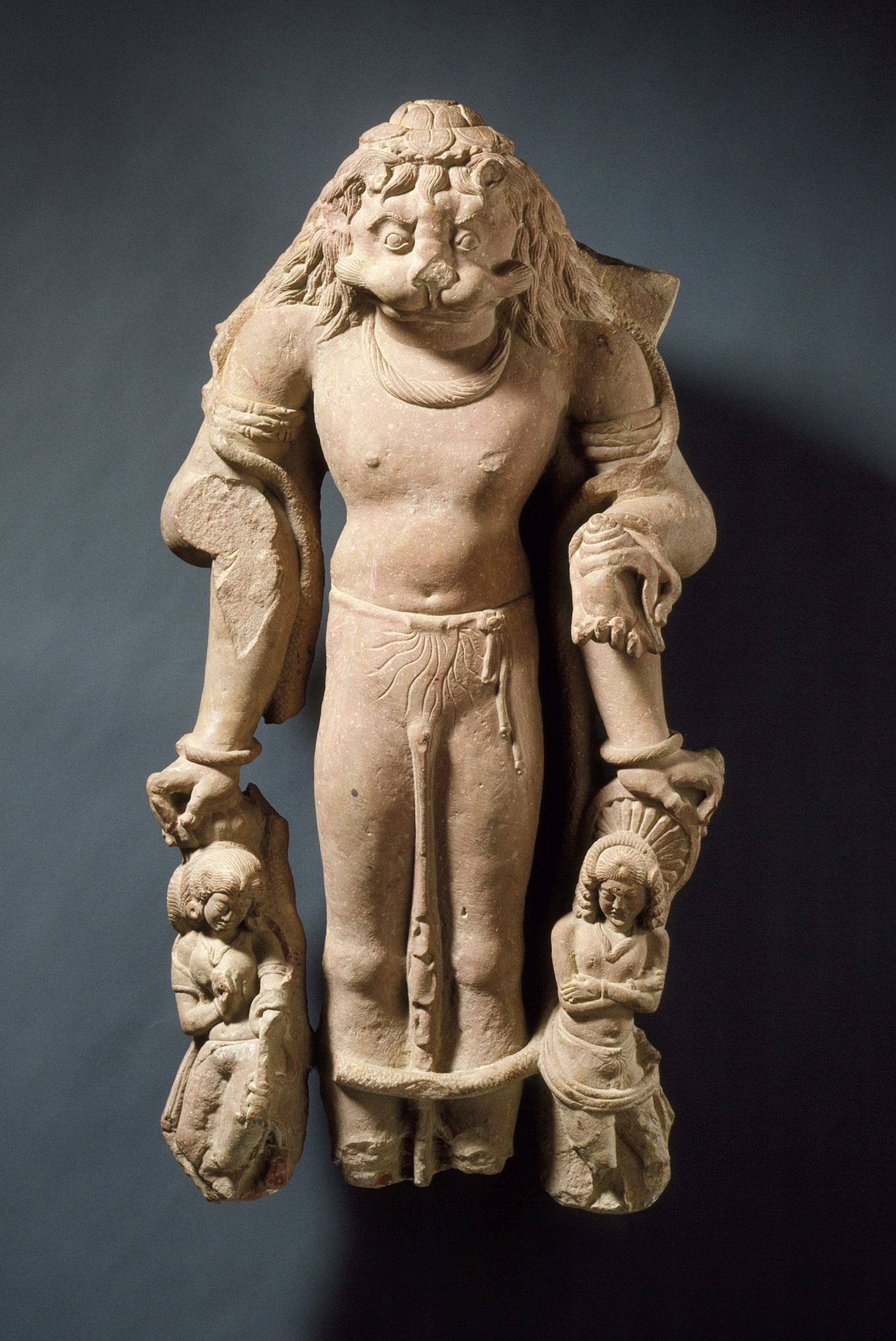
Narasimha, early 6th century, Mathura

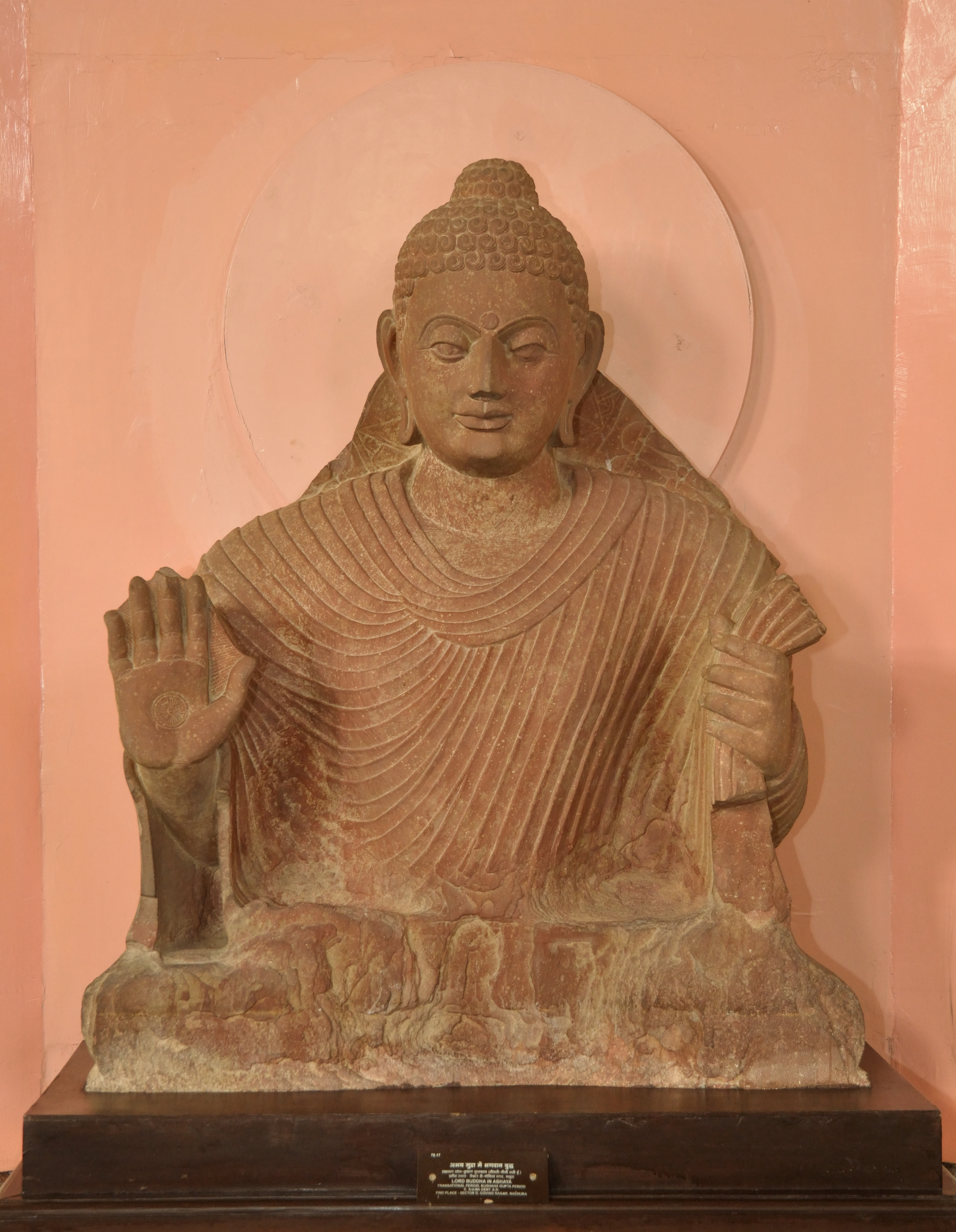
Buddha in Abhaya Mudra. Kushana-Gupta transitional period. Circa 3rd-4th century, Mathura.

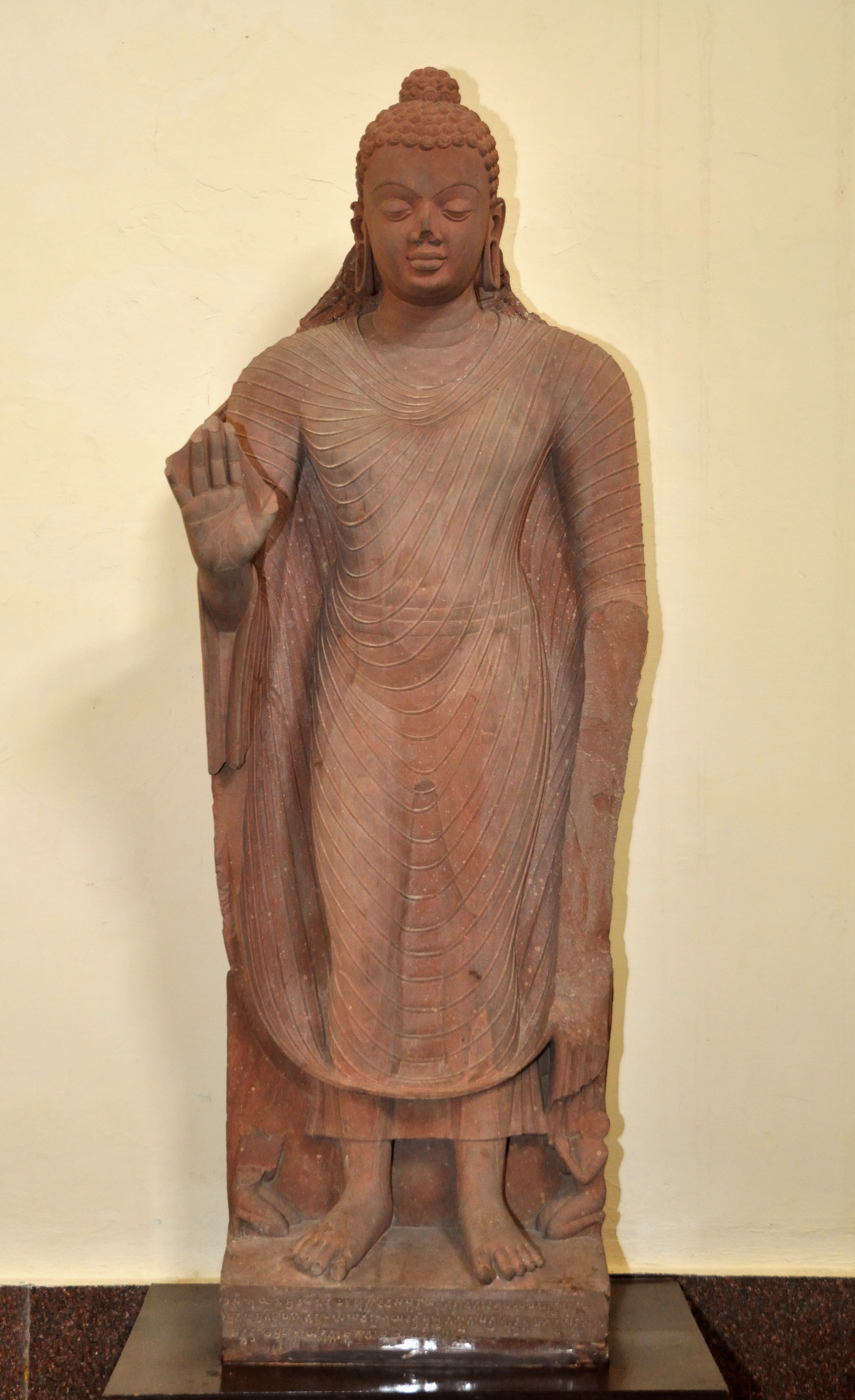
Standing Buddha, inscribed Gupta Era year 115 (434 CE), Mathura.

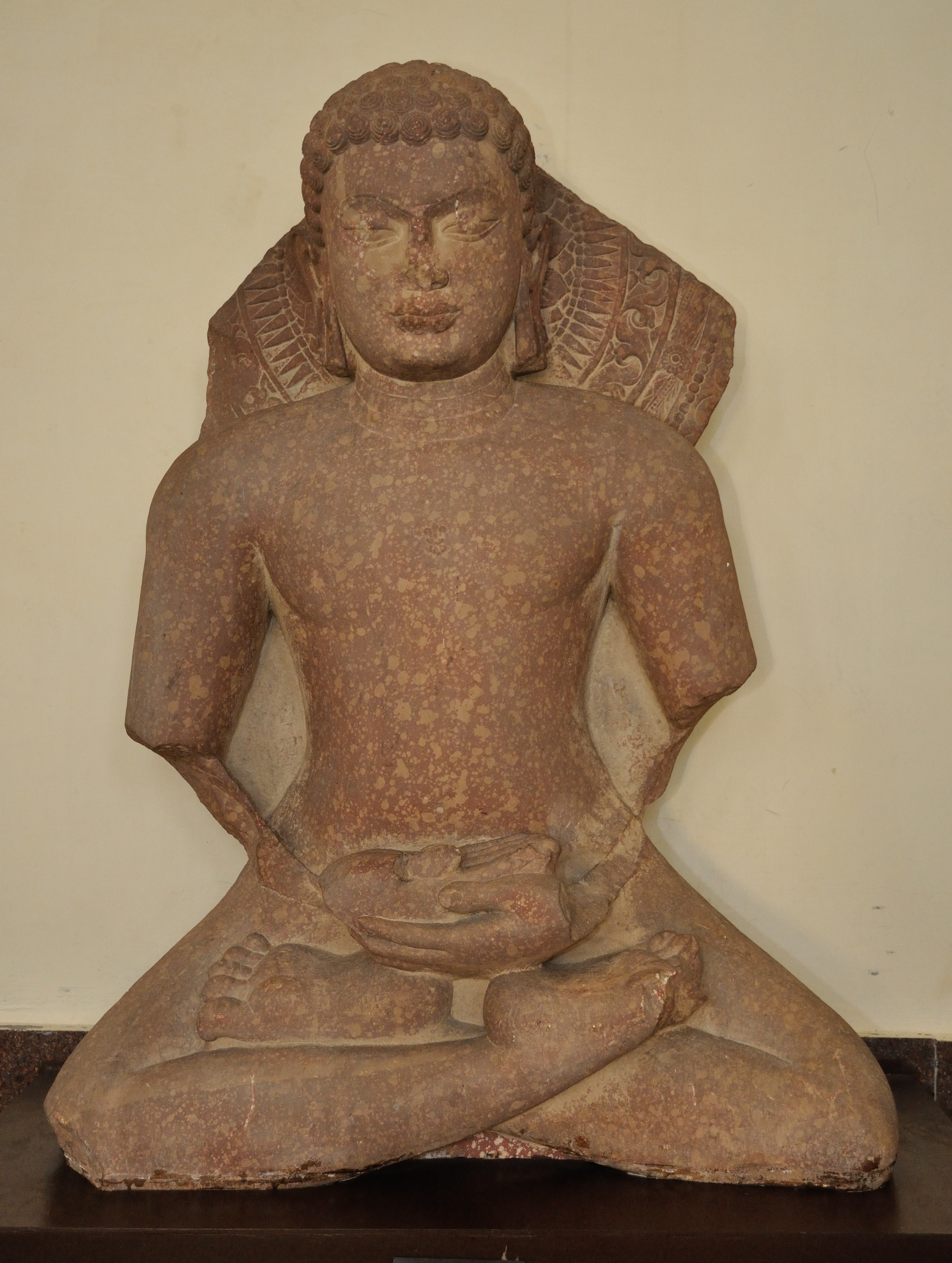
Seated Jain Tirthankara, circa 5th Century CE, Mathura.

=== Sarnath school ===
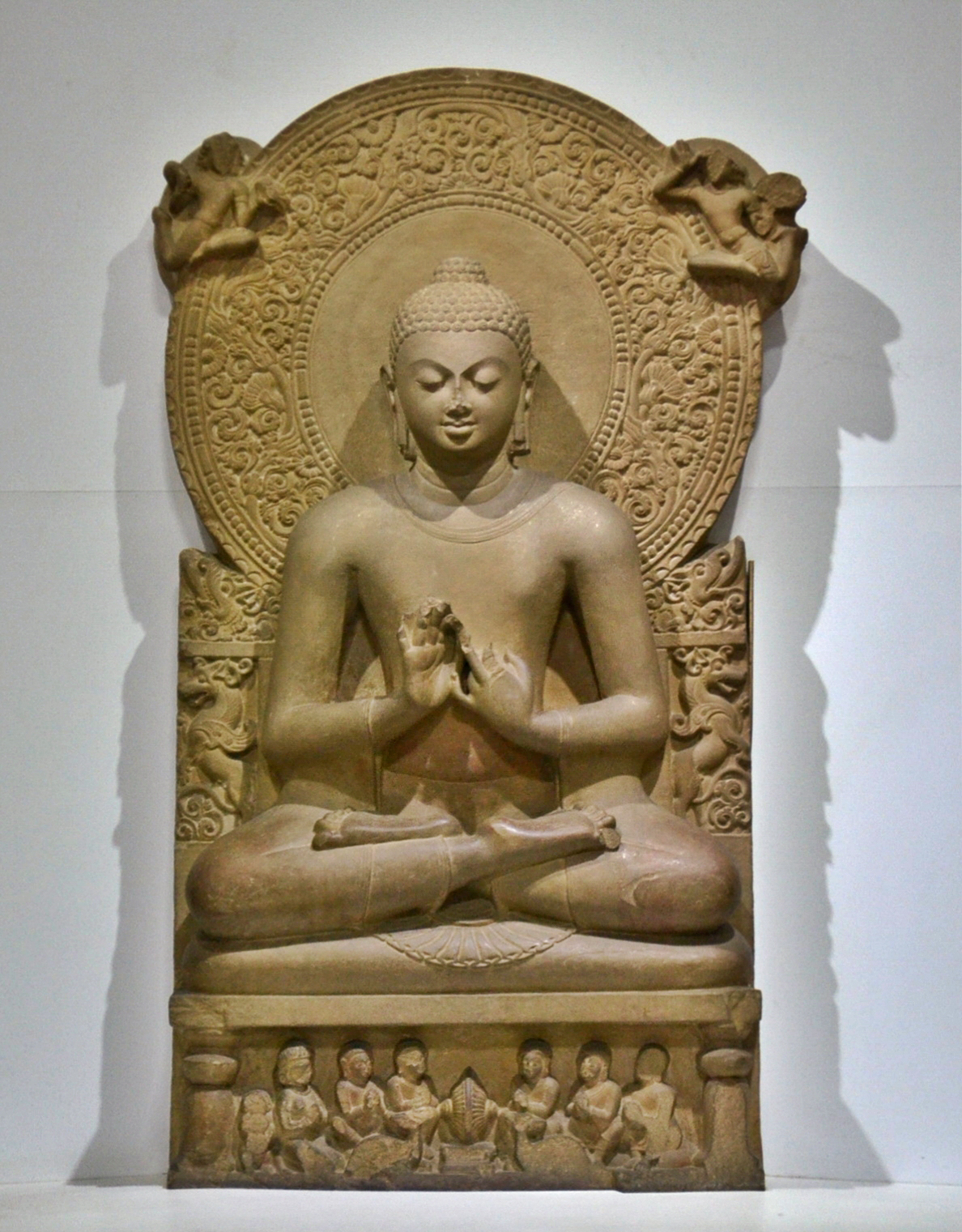
The Dharmachakra Pravartana Buddha at Sarnath, a Gupta statue of the Buddha from Sarnath, Uttar Pradesh, India, last quarter of the 5th century CE. The Buddha is depicted teaching in the lotus position, while making the Dharmacakra mudrā.

The Varanasi/ Sarnath style produced mainly Buddhist art, and "Sarnath Buddhas are probably the greatest single achievement of the Indian sculptor", largely setting the representation of the Buddha that was followed in eastern India and South-East Asia for many centuries, and the general representation of the human body in India. A number of dated examples show that the mature style did not develop until 450–475. It is characterized by its yellowish sandstone from the quarries of Chunar, and lacks the foreign influences seen in Mathura. Folds on clothing have disappeared, and the clothing itself is extremely thin, to the point of being transparent. The halo has become large and is often elaborately decorated. The top edge of the eye-socket is very marked, forming a sharply carved edge.

The Sarnath style was the origin of Buddha images in Siam, Cambodia and Java.

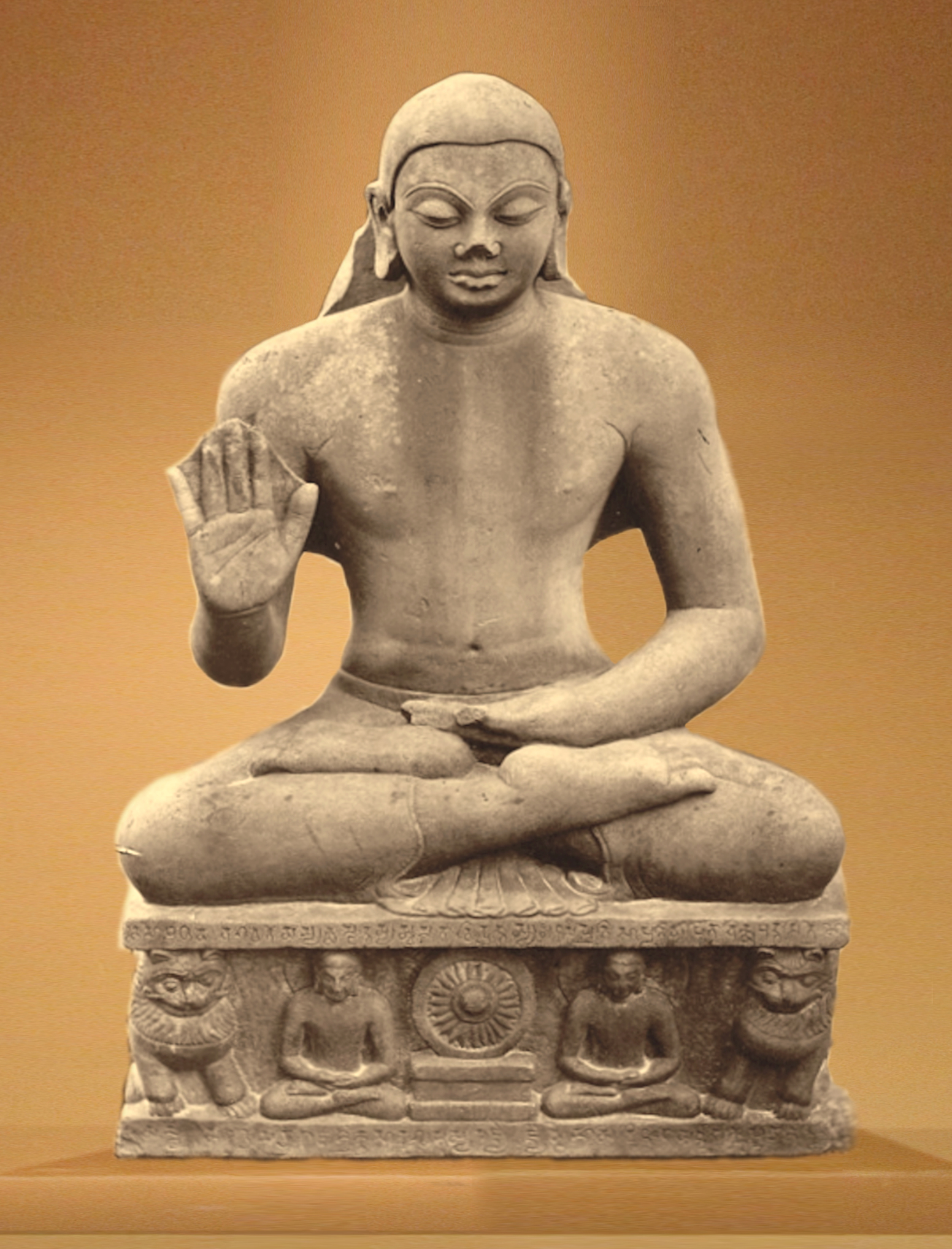
The Mankuwar Buddha, with inscribed date "year 129 in the reign of Maharaja Kumaragupta", hence 448 CE. Mankuwar, District of Allahabad. Lucknow Museum.

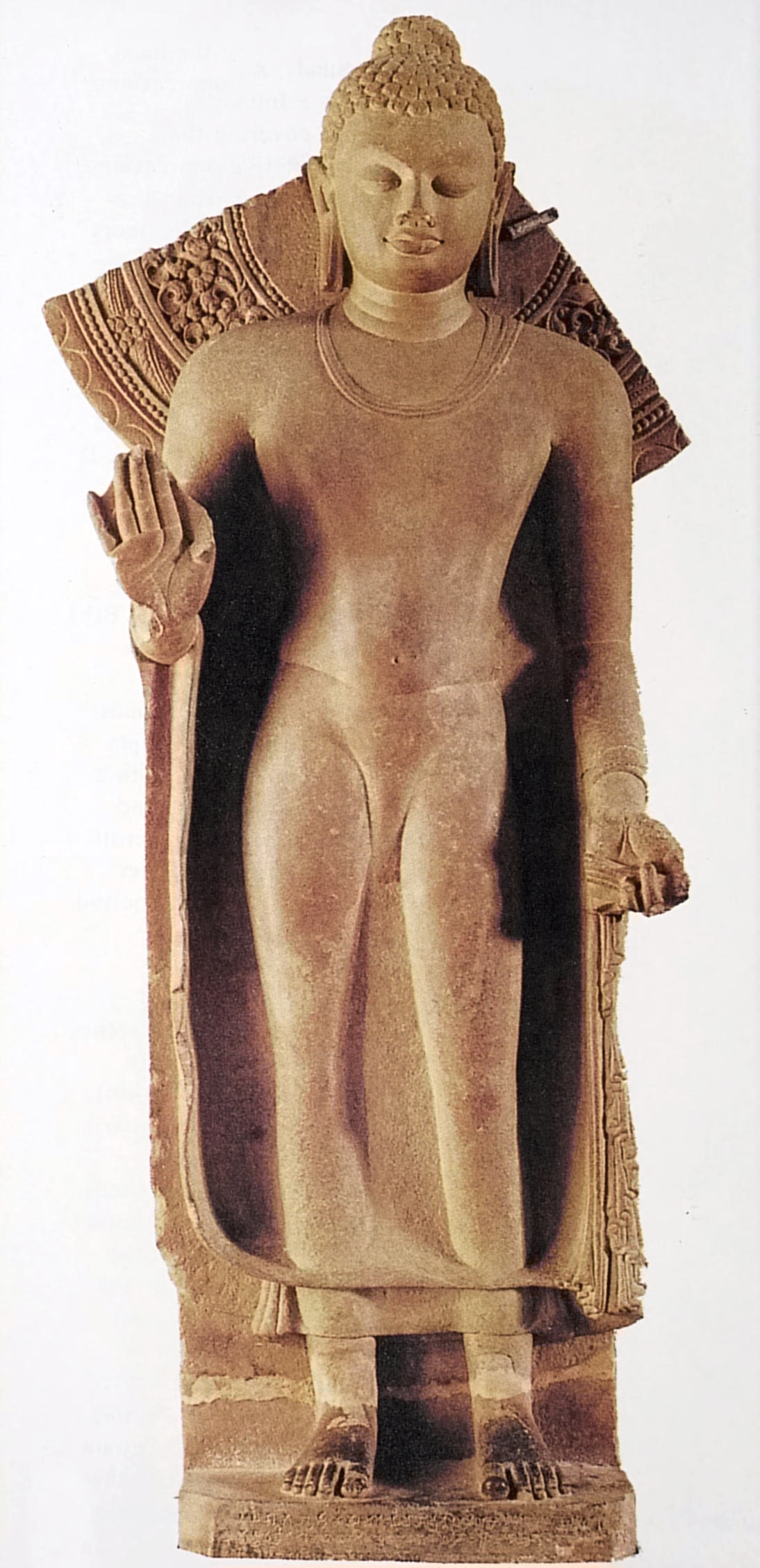
Buddha, standing, inscribed: "Gift of Abhayamira in 154 GE" (474 CE) in the reign of Kumaragupta II. Sarnath Museum.

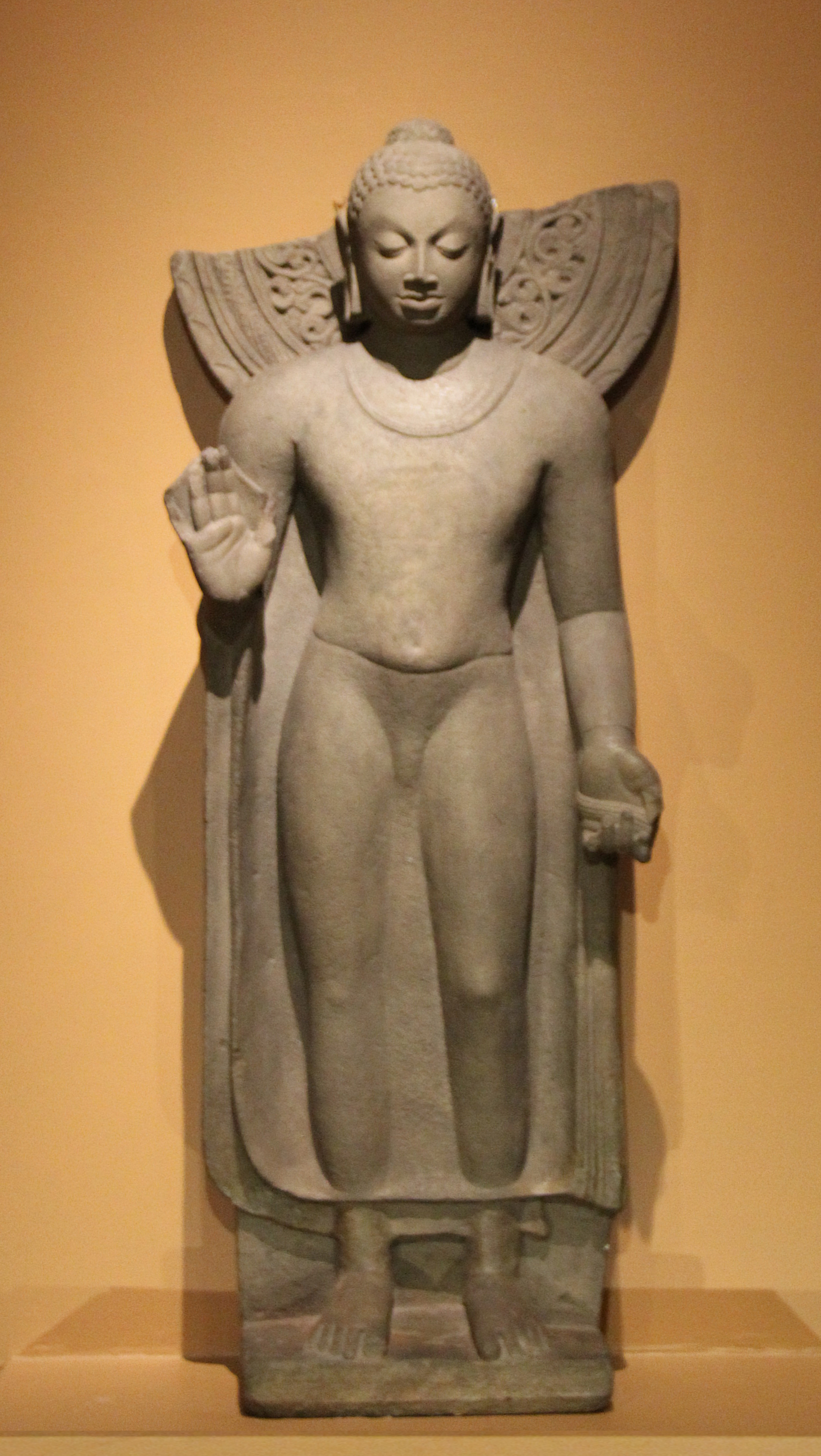
5th century Sarnath statue, Indian Museum.

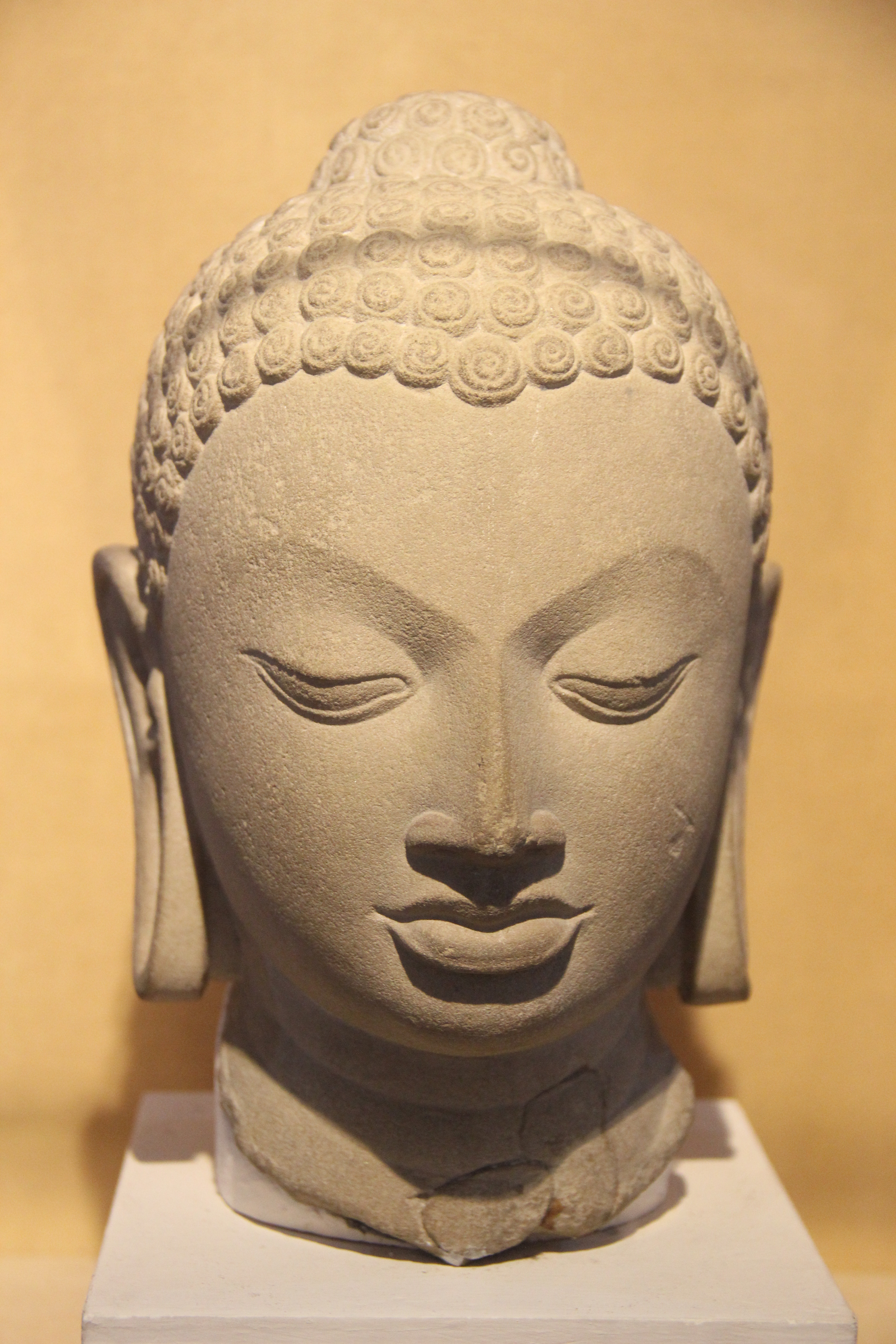
Buddha head, Sarnath, 5th century

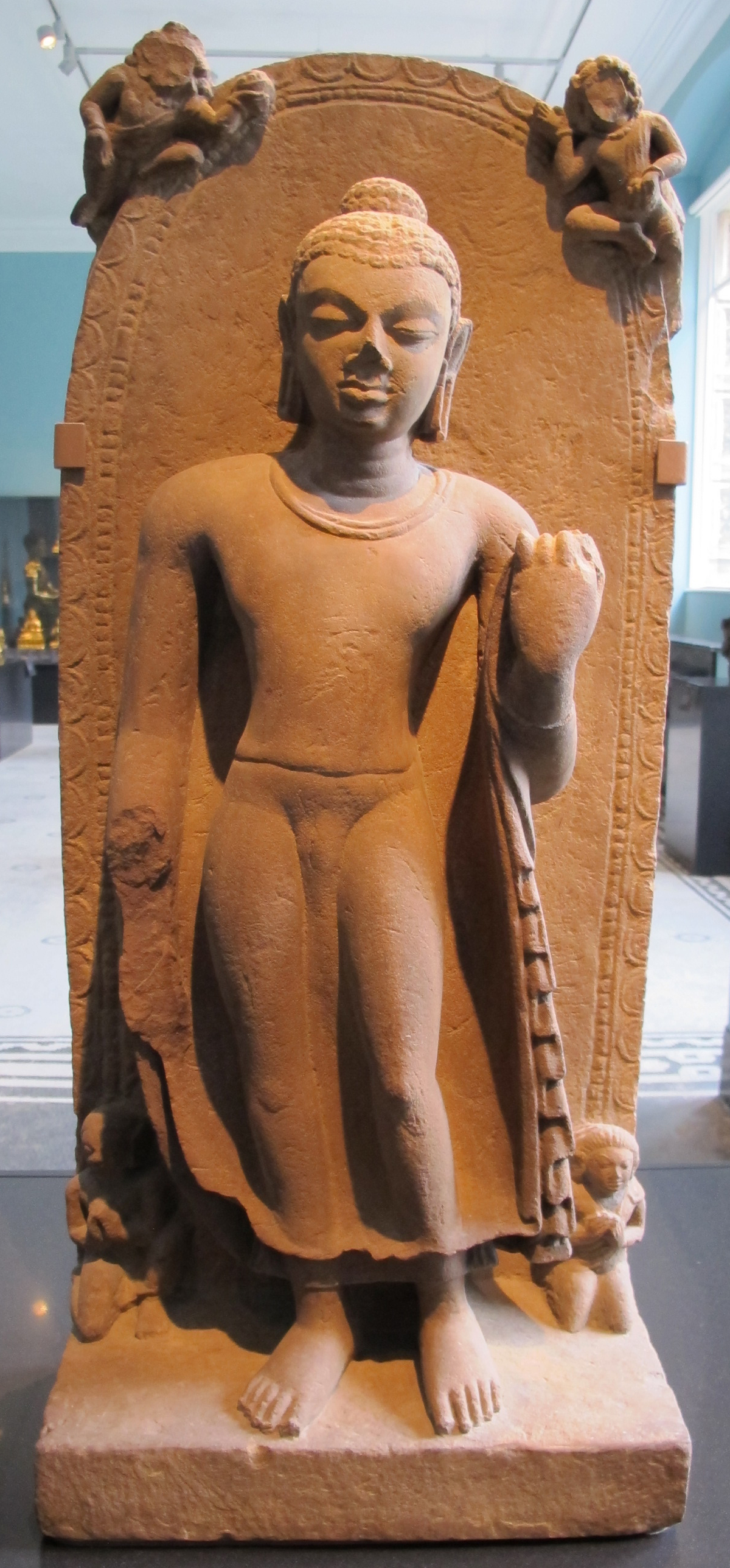
Buddha, 450-500

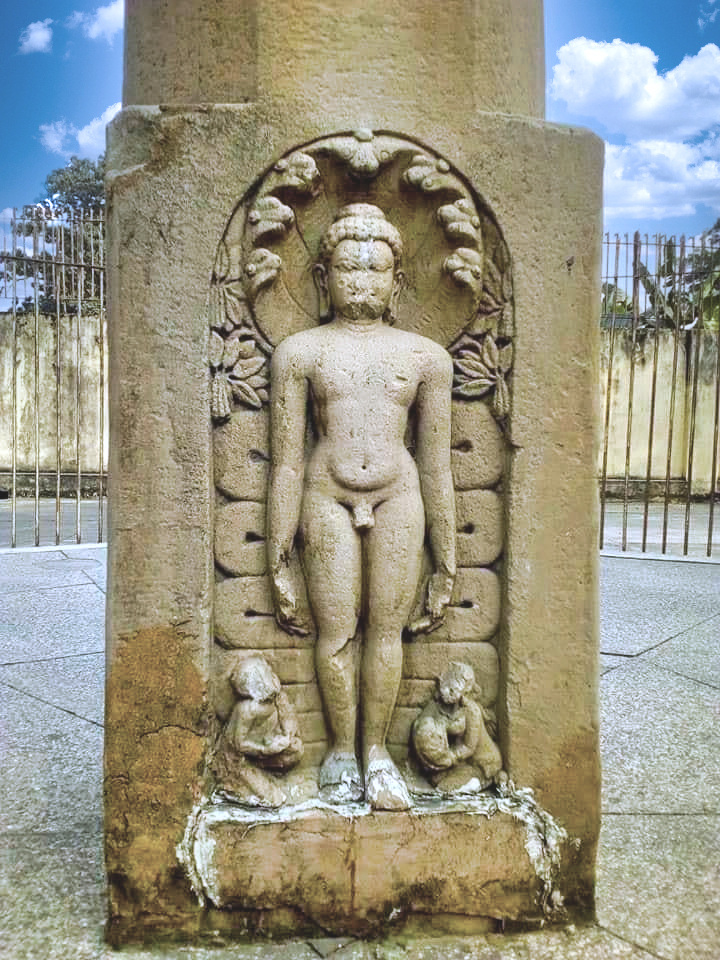
Relief of Jain tirthankara Parshvanatha on the Kahaum pillar erected by Skandagupta in 461 CE

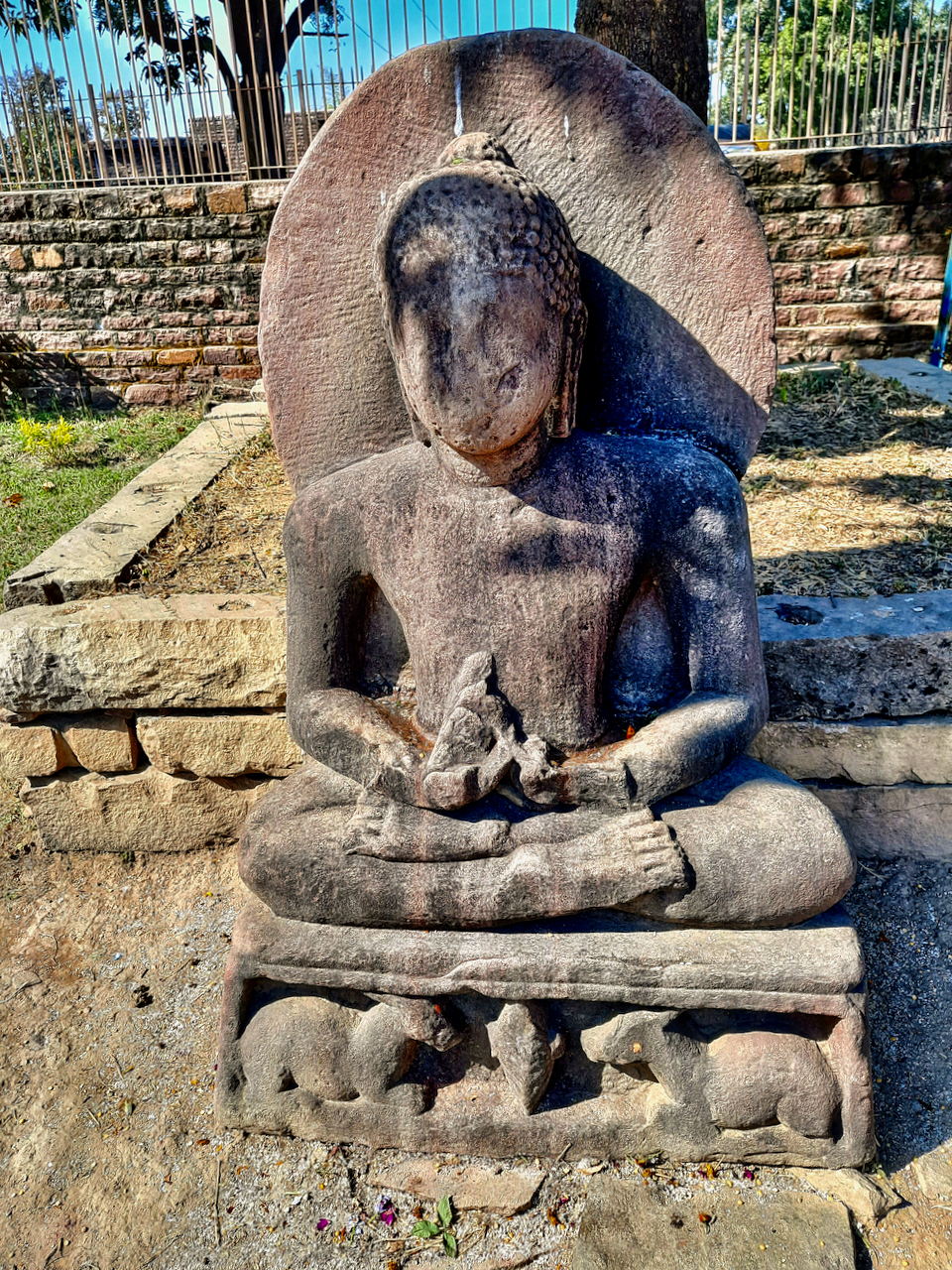
Neminatha statue (c. 475 CE) Shreyansh Giri

=== Other centres ===
Nalanda

Gupta sculptural qualities tend to deteriorate with time, as in Nalanda in Bihar in the 6th century BCE, figures become heavier and tend to be made in metal. This evolution suggests a third school of Gupta art in the area Nalanda and Pataliputra, besides the two main centres of Mathura and Vanarasi. The colossal Sultanganj Buddha in copper from the area of Pataliputra is a uniquely large survival from this school, but typical in style. In the same monastery two similar but much smaller (and slightly later) figures in stone were found, one now on display in the British Museum.

Udayagiri Caves/Vidisha

The "first dated sculptures in a fully-fledged early Gupta style" come from the rock-cut Udayagiri Caves and the surrounding area near Vidisha in Madhya Pradesh. Though the caves, all but one Hindu, are "of negligible importance architecturally", around the cave entrances are a number of rock relief panels, some with large deities. They are in a relatively crude and heavy style, but often with a powerful impact; Harle describes the mukhalinga in Cave 4 as "pulsating with psychic power". The most famous is the 7 x 4 metre relief of Vishnu in the form of the giant boar Varaha, raising the earth from the primordial waters, watched by rows of much smaller gods, sages and celestial beings. One cave also has an extremely rare inscription relating a site to the Gupta court, recording the donation of a minister of Chandragupta II. The famous Iron pillar of Delhi is thought likely to have been originally set up outside the caves.

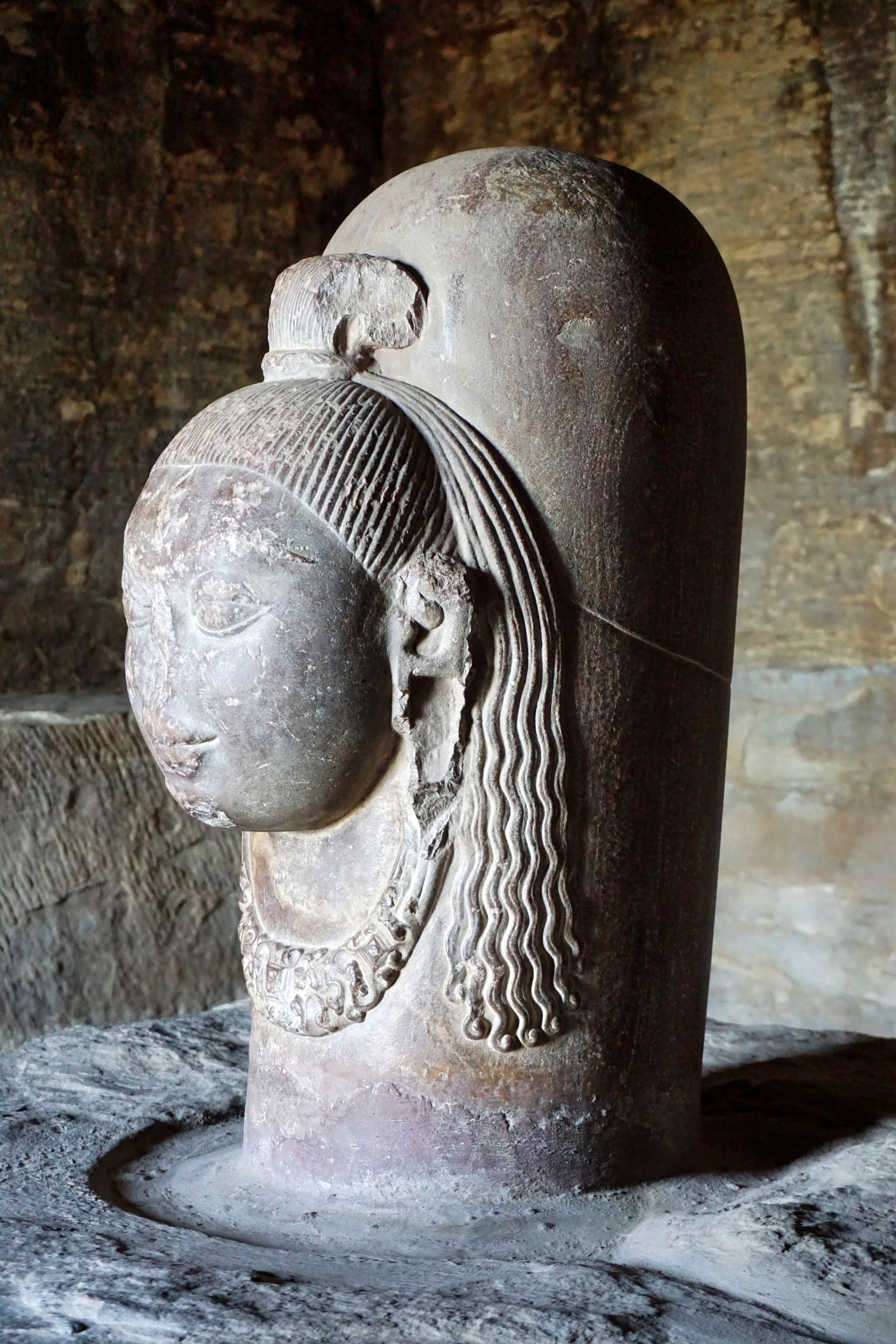
Udayagiri Caves mukhalinga (Cave 4), described as "pulsating with psychic power".

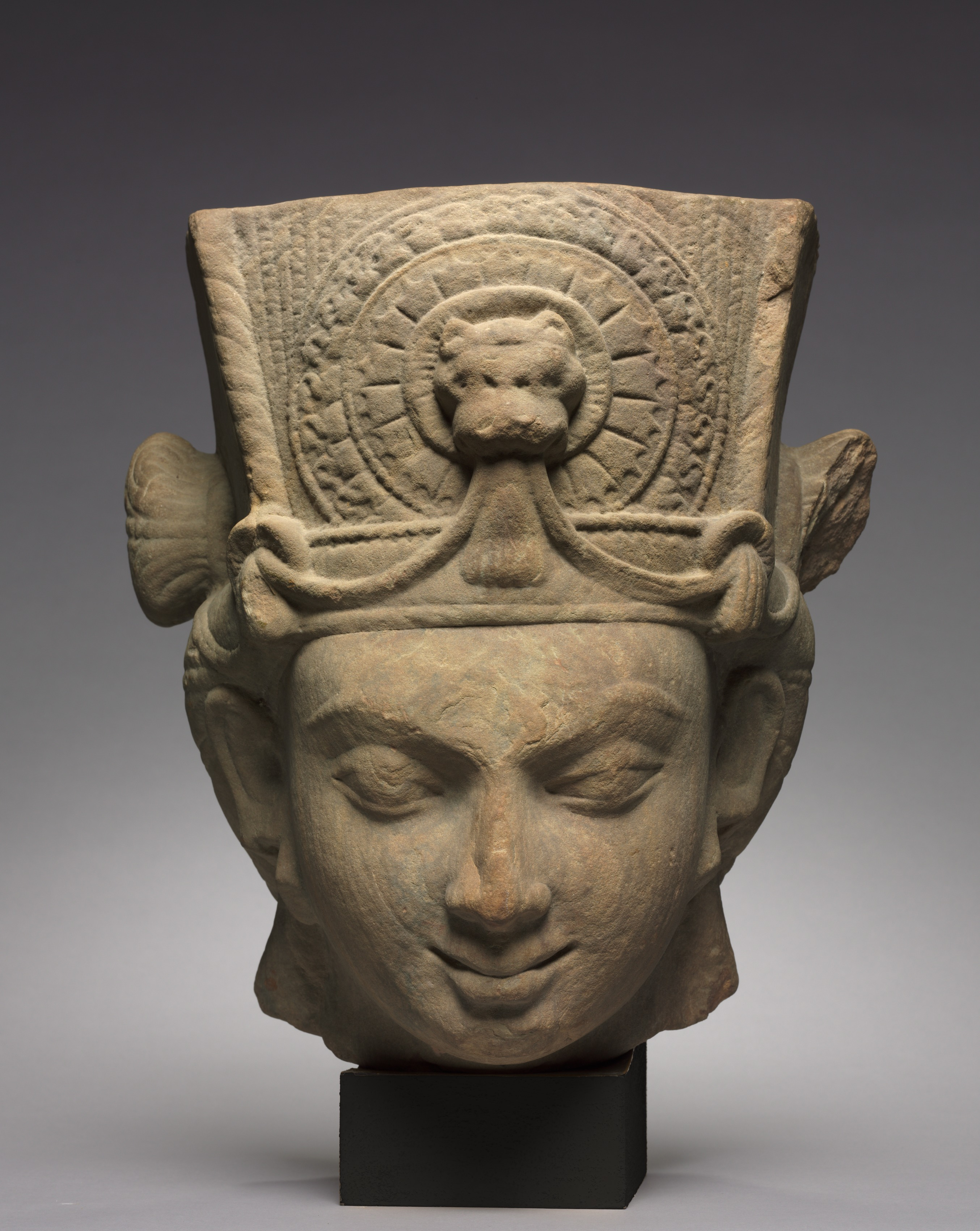
Head of Vishnu from Vidisha near Udayagiri, Central India, 4th century

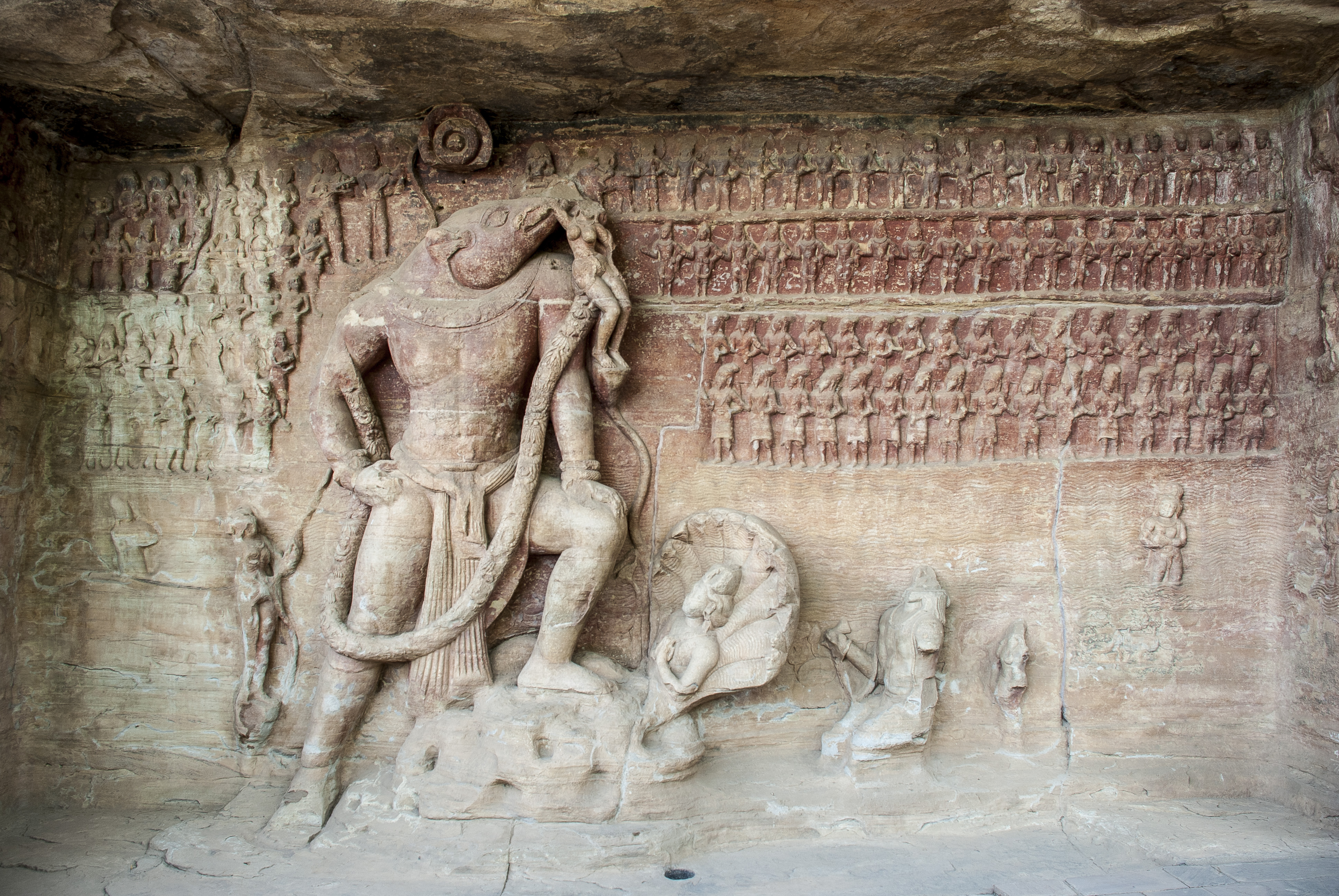
Vishnu in the form of Varaha, Udayagiri caves, circa 400 CE. In front, probable relief of Chandragupta II (380–415 CE) kneeling, paying homage to Varaha.

Eran

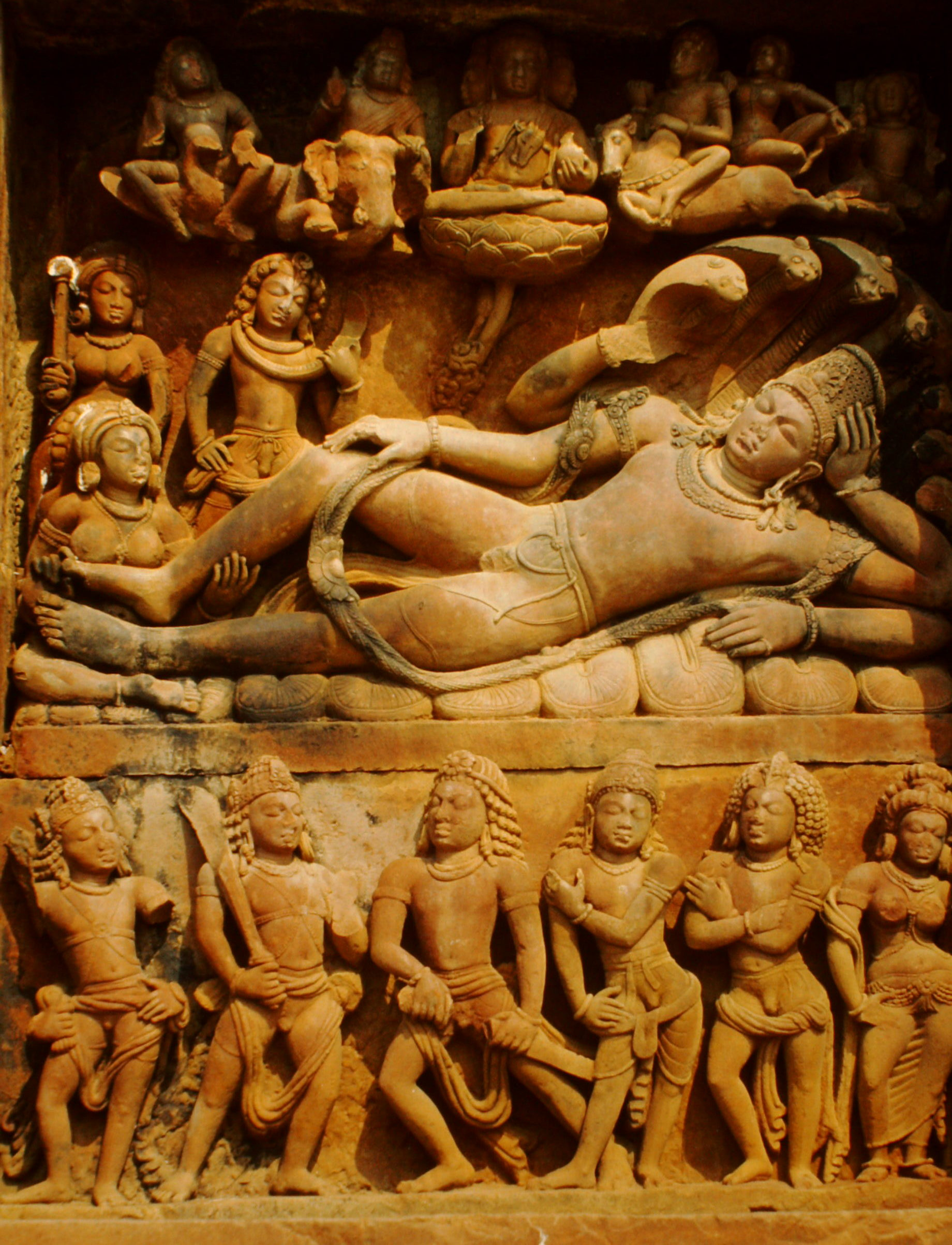
Vishnu sleeping, protected by Shesha, Dashavatara Temple, Deogarh

Eran in Madhya Pradesh has a "pillar" or large single column dated 484/5 by an inscription of Buddhagupta, the only standing Gupta example, with two Garuda figures at the top (illustrated below). It had two large Varaha figures outside the ruined Gupta temple. The style of the sculpture is somewhat provincial. Still at the site is a huge and impressive boar on four legs, with no human characteristics, its body covered with rows of small figures representing the sages who clung to the hairs of Varaha to save themselves from the waters. Now moved to the university museum at Sagar is a figure with the same body and pose as that at Udayagiri, "one of the greatest of all Indian sculptures ... nothing can match the figure's air of insolent triumph". Both are dated to the late fifth century.

Others

The surviving sanctuary of the early 6th-century Dashavatara Temple, Deogarh has a typically fine doorway, and large relief panels on the other three walls. These are now external, but would originally gave given on to the covered ambulatory. Though "majestic", these show "the sturdiness of early Gupta sculpture is yielding to a softer, more delicate and ultimately weaker style". The row of men beneath the sleeping Vishnu have "stylized poses, probably imitated from the theatre".

There are also other minor centres of Gupta sculpture, particularly in the areas of Dasapura and Mandasor, where a huge eight-faced mukhalinga (probably early 6th-century) found in the river has been reinstalled in the Pashupatinath Temple, Mandsaur.

The Greco-Buddhist art of Gandhara continued a late phase through at least most of the Gupta period, having also been a formative influence.

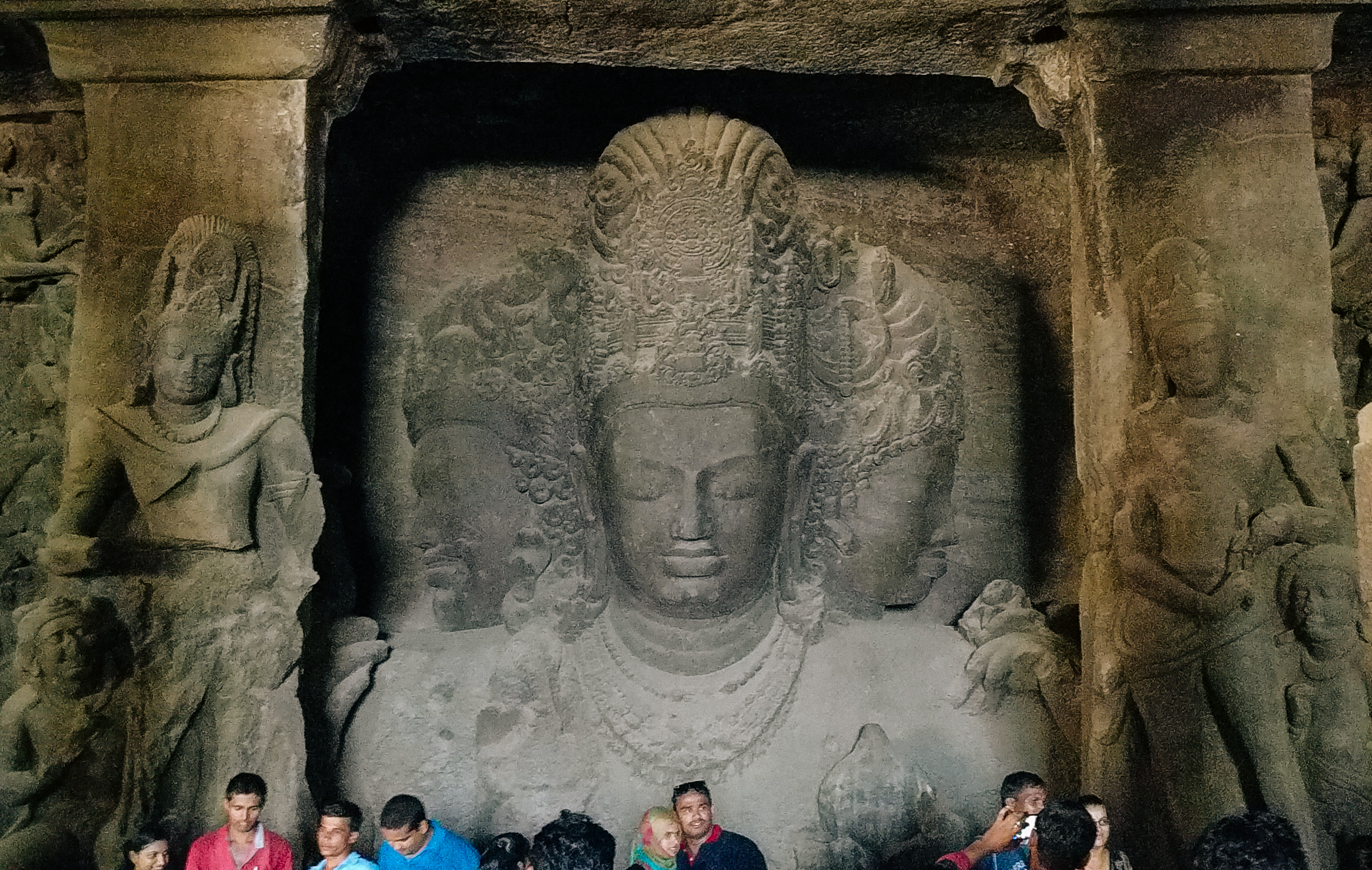
Elephanta Caves, triple-bust (trimurti) of Shiva, 18 feet (5.5 m) tall, c. 550.

Very important rock-cut sites outside the Gupta Empire proper, to the south, are the Ajanta Caves and Elephanta Caves, both mostly created in the Gupta period, and the Ellora Caves which were probably begun around the end of it. As it was mainly restricted to the Gangetic plain, the vast Gupta territories included relatively few rock-cut sites with much sculpture. The later Ajanta style of sculpture is somewhat heavy, but sometimes "awe-inspiring" in the large seated shrine Buddhas, but other smaller figures are often very fine, as is the ornamental carving on columns and door-frames.

When combined with the painted walls, the effect can be considered over-decorated, and lacking "motifs on a larger scale to serve as focal points". The main internal carving was probably completed by 478, though votive figures to the sides of many cave entrances may be later. The Ajanta style is only seen at a few other sites nearby. After work ended there much of the skilled workforce, or their descendants, probably ended up working at Elephanta and then Ellora.

Unlike the series of caves side by side at Ajanta, the main interest at Elephanta is the largest cave, a huge Shiva temple, and above all the colossal triple-bust (trimurti) of Shiva, 18 feet (5.5 m) tall, which "because it is so amazingly skilfully placed in relation to the various external entrances ... receives exactly the amount of light necessary to make it look as if it is emerging from a black void, manifestation from the unmanifest". Also from the Mumbai area, the Parel Relief or (Parel Shiva) is an important late Gupta monolithic relief of Shiva in seven forms.

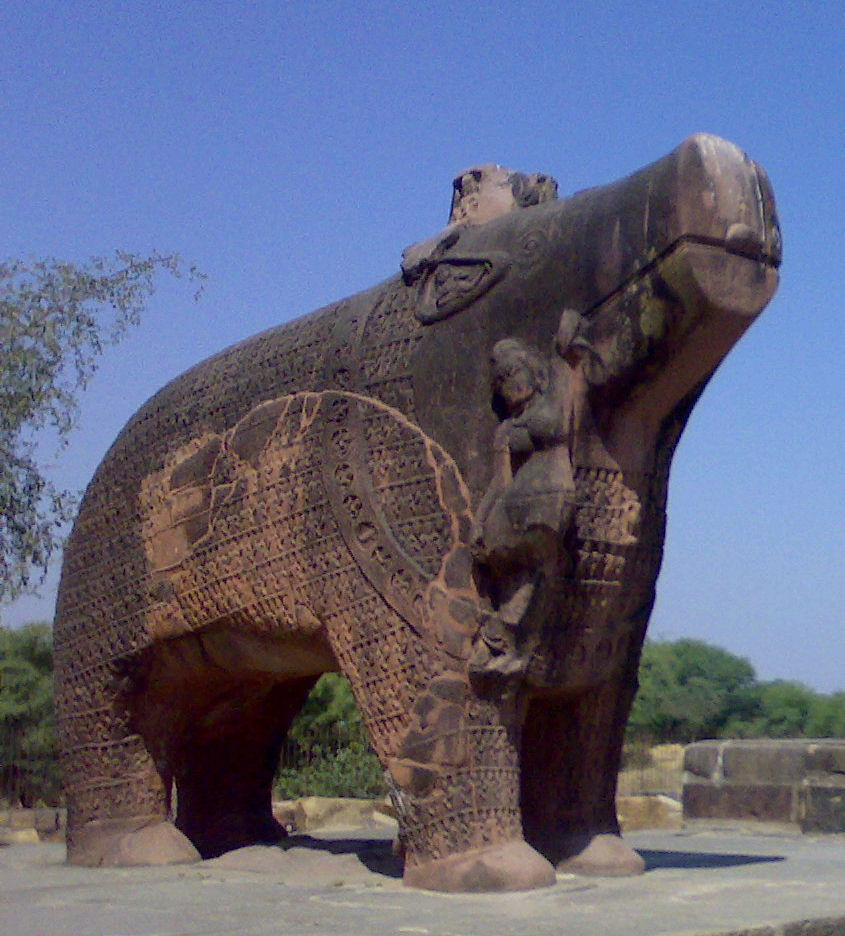
The Eran Varaha, about 5 metres long, dedicated by Huna ruler Toramana circa 510 CE.

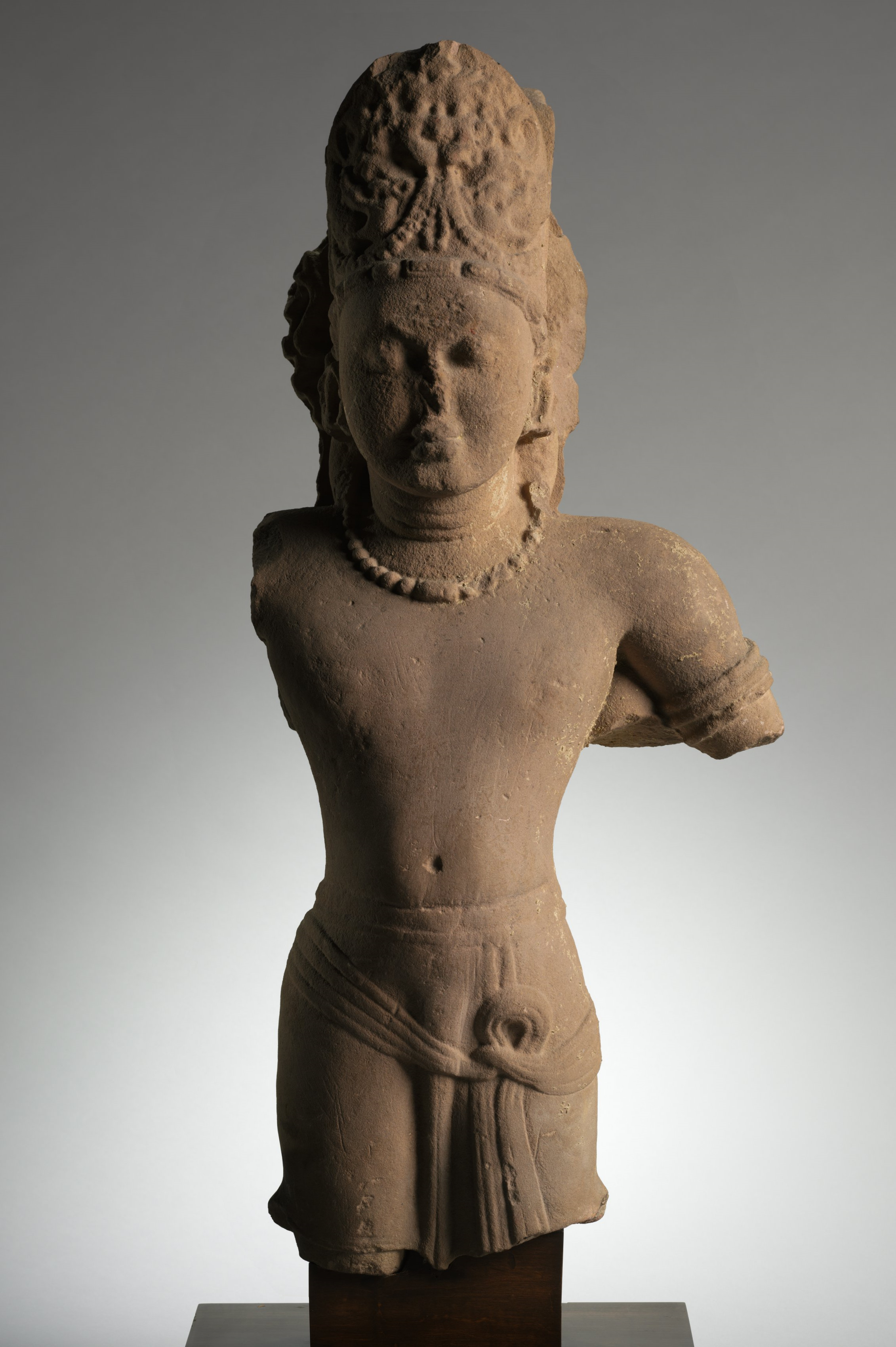
Vishnu, Central India, 5th century

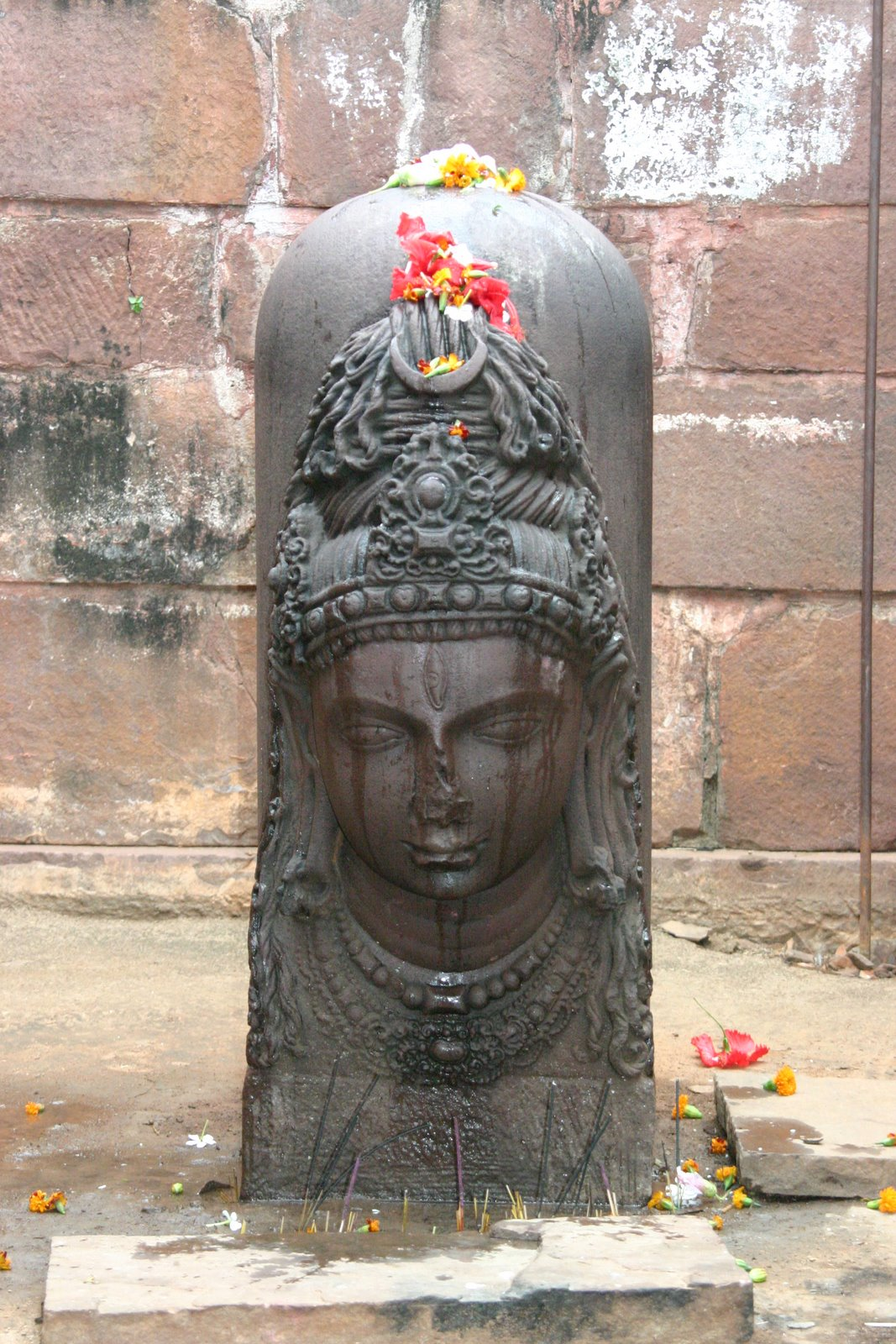
Shiva mukhalinga, Bhumara Temple, 5th or 6th century, Madhya Pradesh

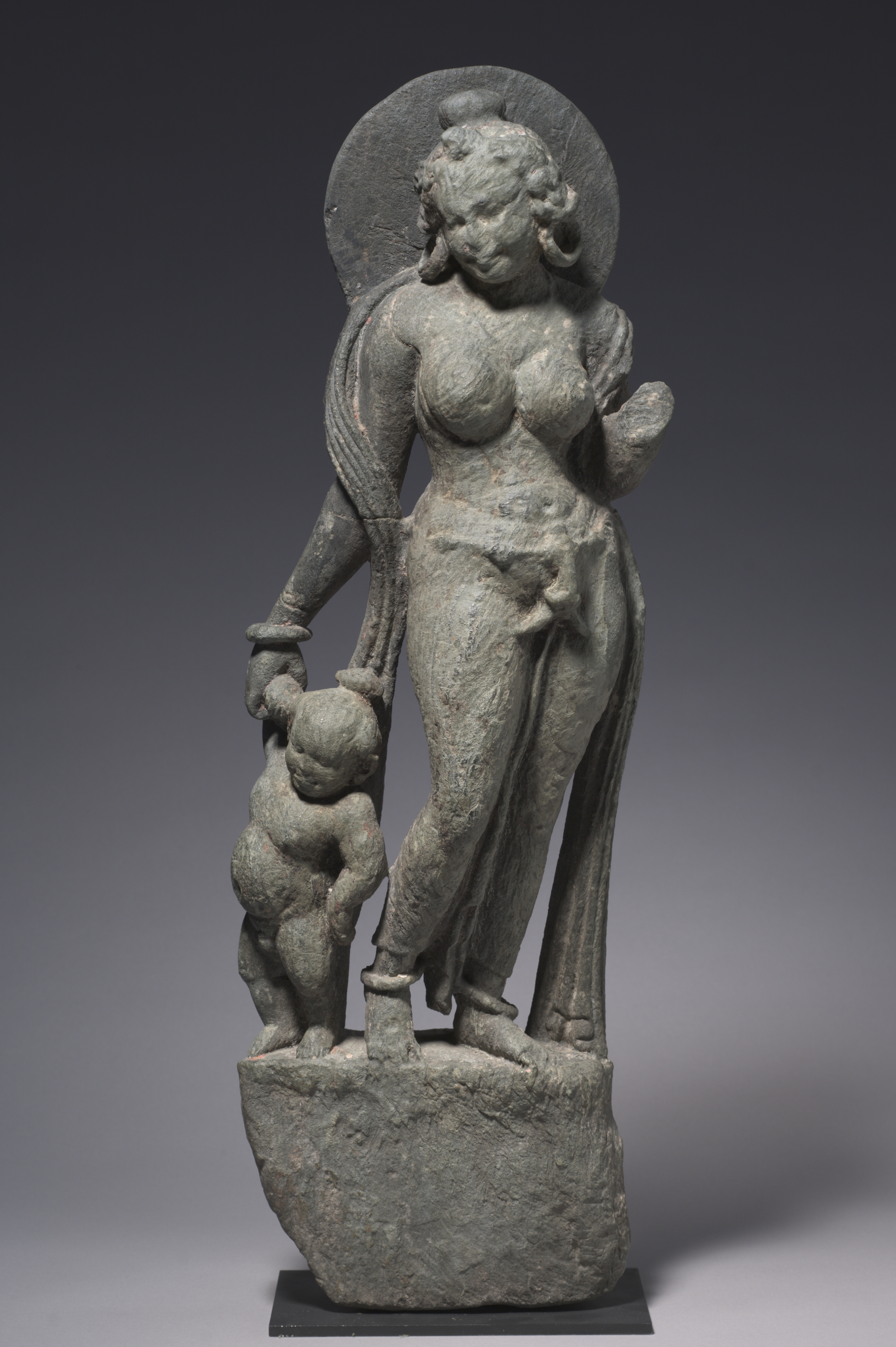
Mother Goddess from entrance of a Hindu Temple, Tanesara-Mahadeva (near Udaipur), suggesting connections with the Art of Gandhara. 5th-6th or early 7th century CE.

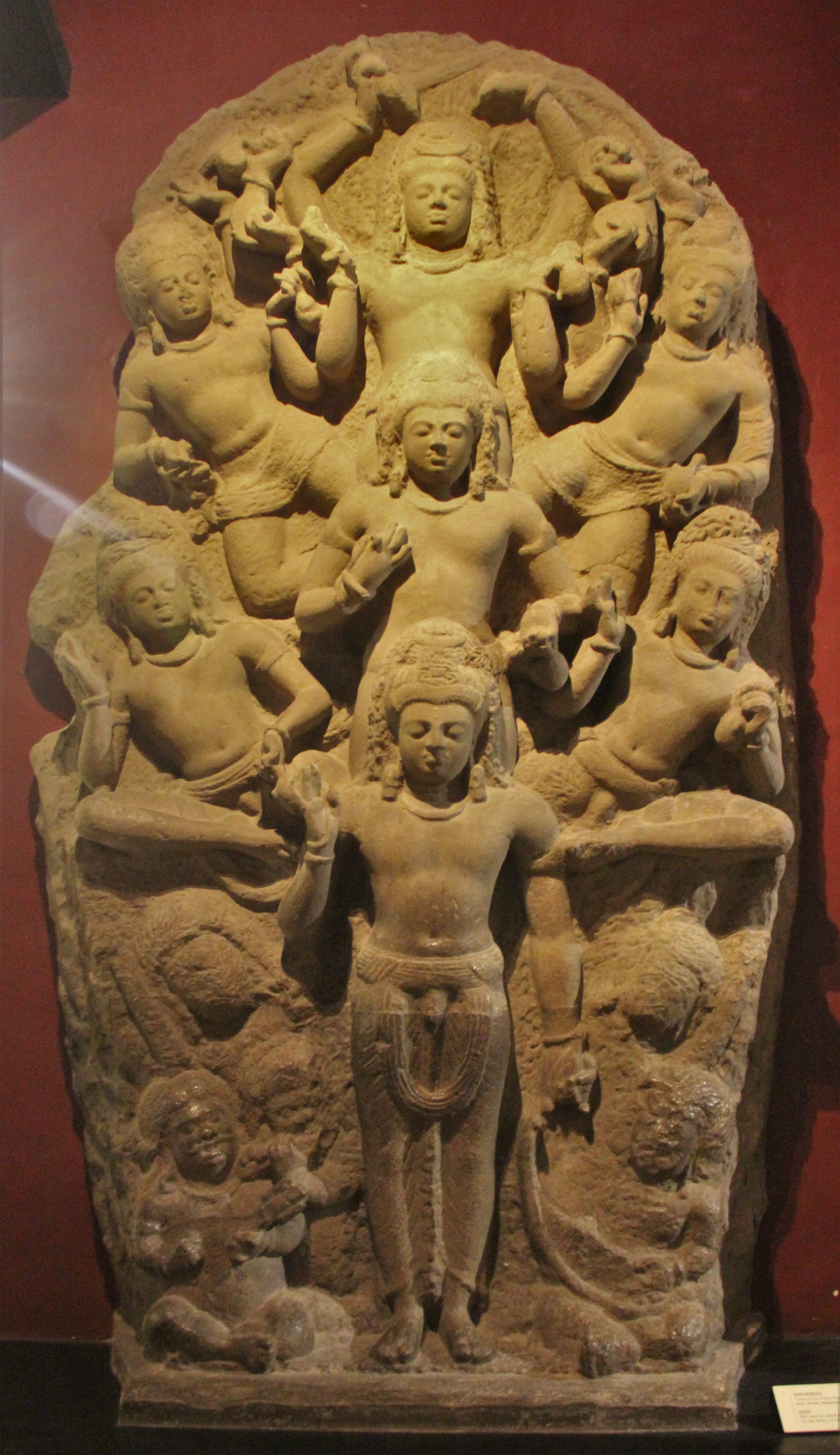
Cast of the Parel Relief, in the Chhatrapati Shivaji Maharaj Vastu Sangrahalaya

== Terracotta sculpture ==
The earliest terracottas datable to the Gupta period appear under the Western Satraps at the Buddhist site of Devnimori in Gujarat circa 375–400 CE, representing the southern extension of Gandharan influence to the subcontinent, which persisted locally with the sites of Mīrpur Khās, Śāmalājī or Dhānk, a century before this influence would further extend to Ajanta and Sarnath. It has even been suggested that the art of the Western Satraps and Devnimori were at the origin of Gupta material culture, but this remains a subject of debate.

The Gupta period saw the production of many sculptures in terracotta of very fine quality, and they are similar in style across the empire, to an even greater extent than the stone sculpture. Some can still be seen in their original settings on the brick temple at Bhitargaon, where the large relief panels have almost worn away, but various heads and figures survive at higher levels. The very elegant pair of river goddesses excavated from a temple at Ahichchhatra are 1.47 metres high.

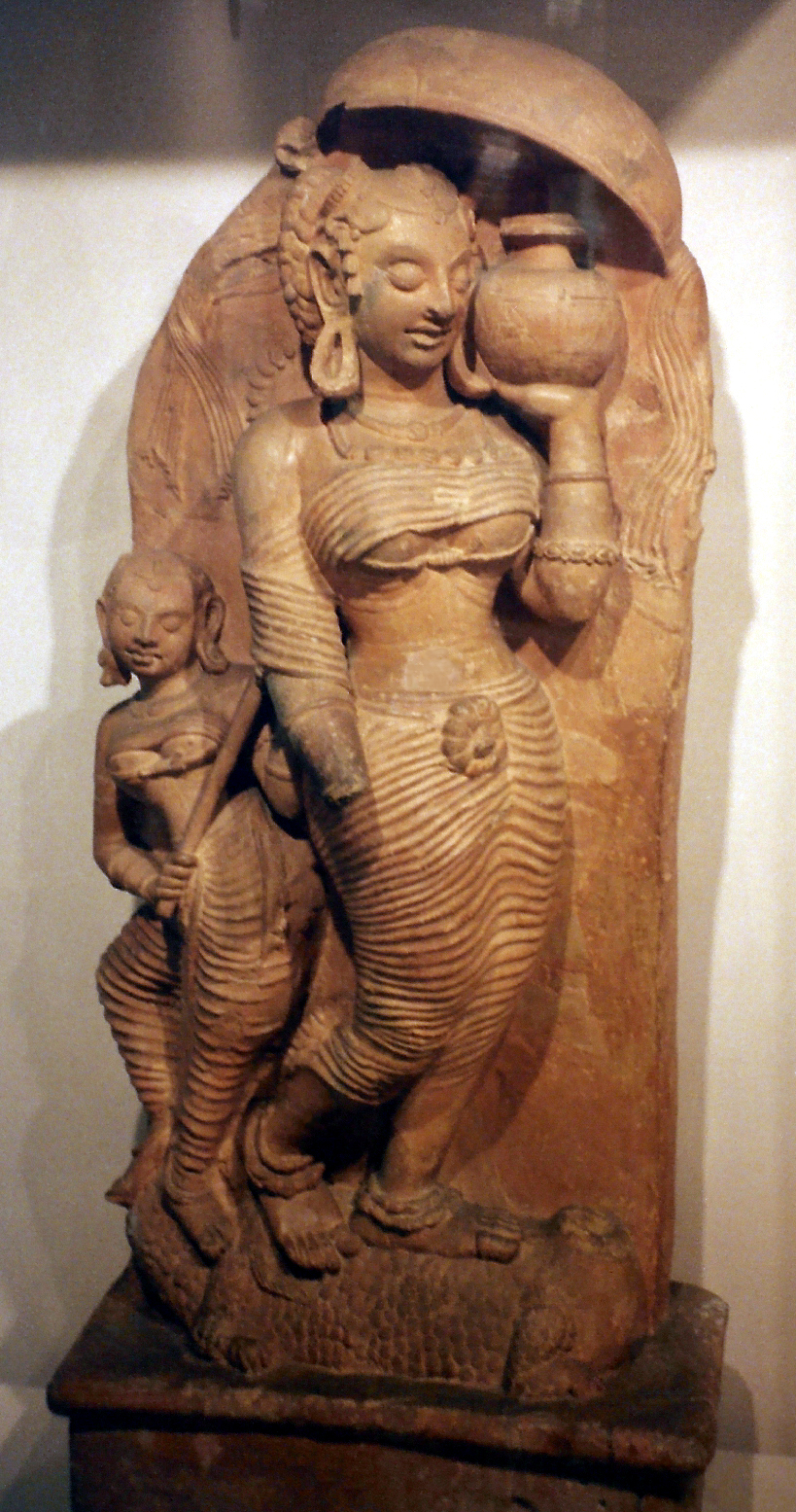
Terracotta Ganges and attendant; 1.47 metres, from Ahichchhatra, 5th-6th century CE, National Museum, New Delhi.

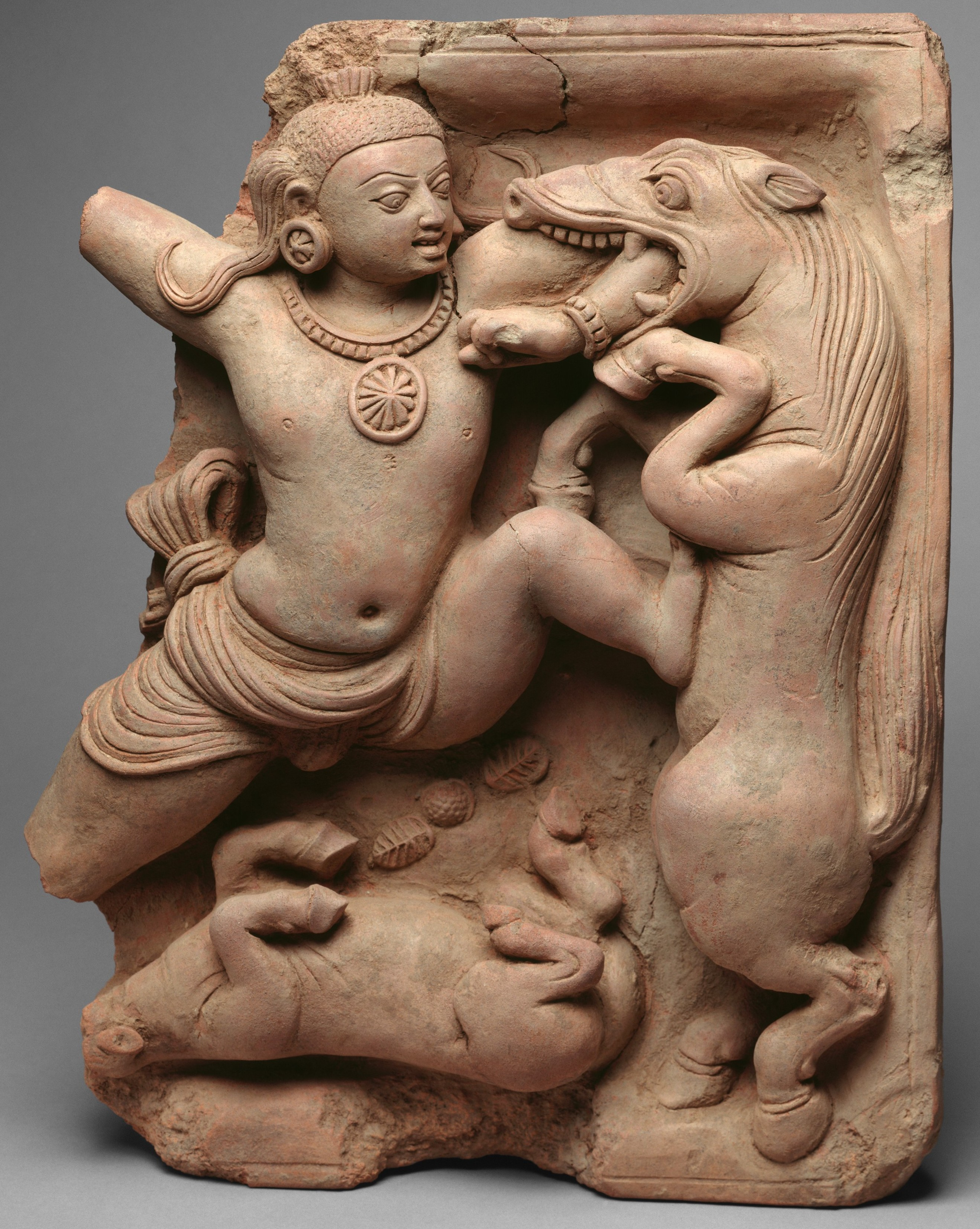
Terracotta of Krishna battling the horse demon Keshi, Uttar Pradesh, 5th century

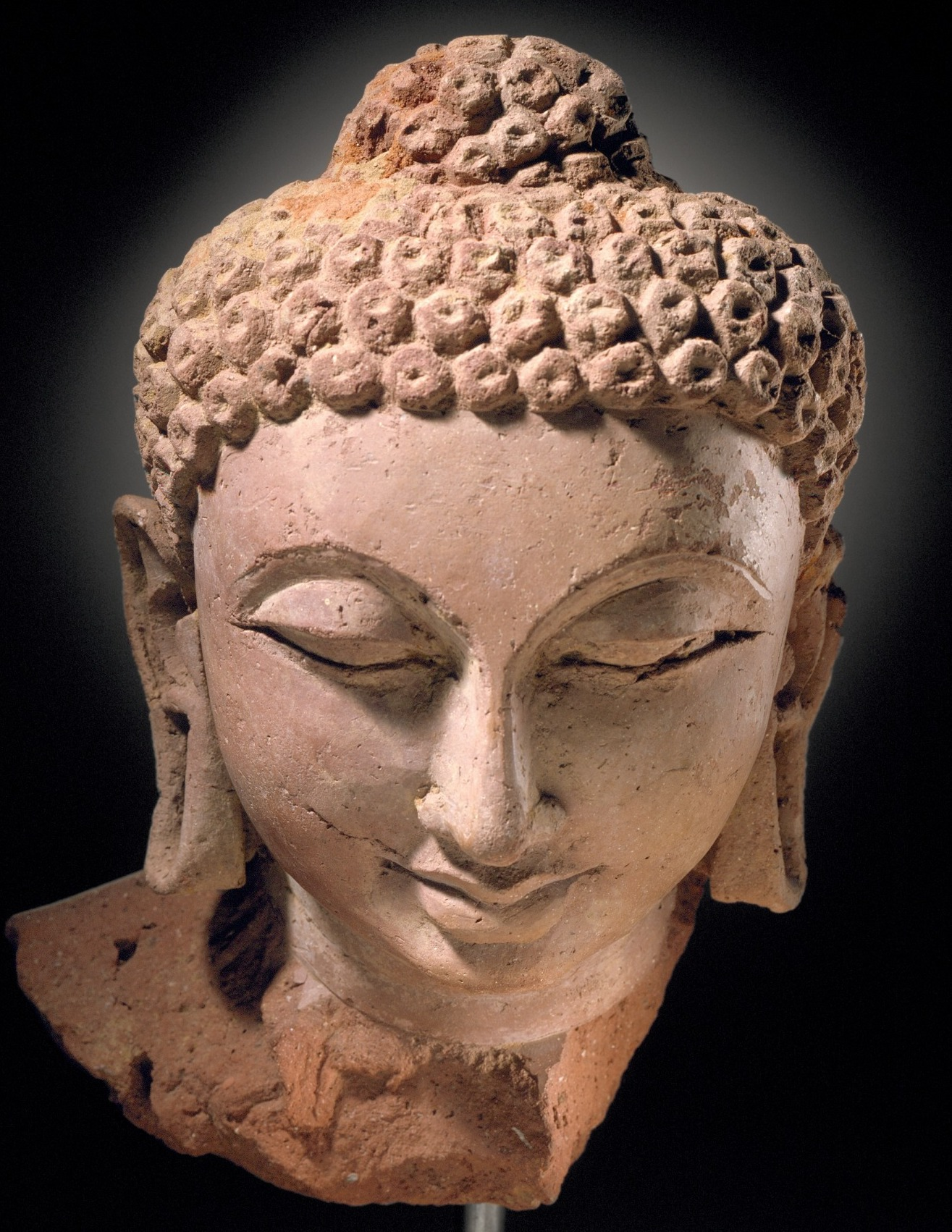
Terracotta Buddha head, Devnimori, Gujarat, 375-400. These early terracottas show the influence of the Greco-Buddhist art of Gandhara, and belong to the art of the Western Satraps.

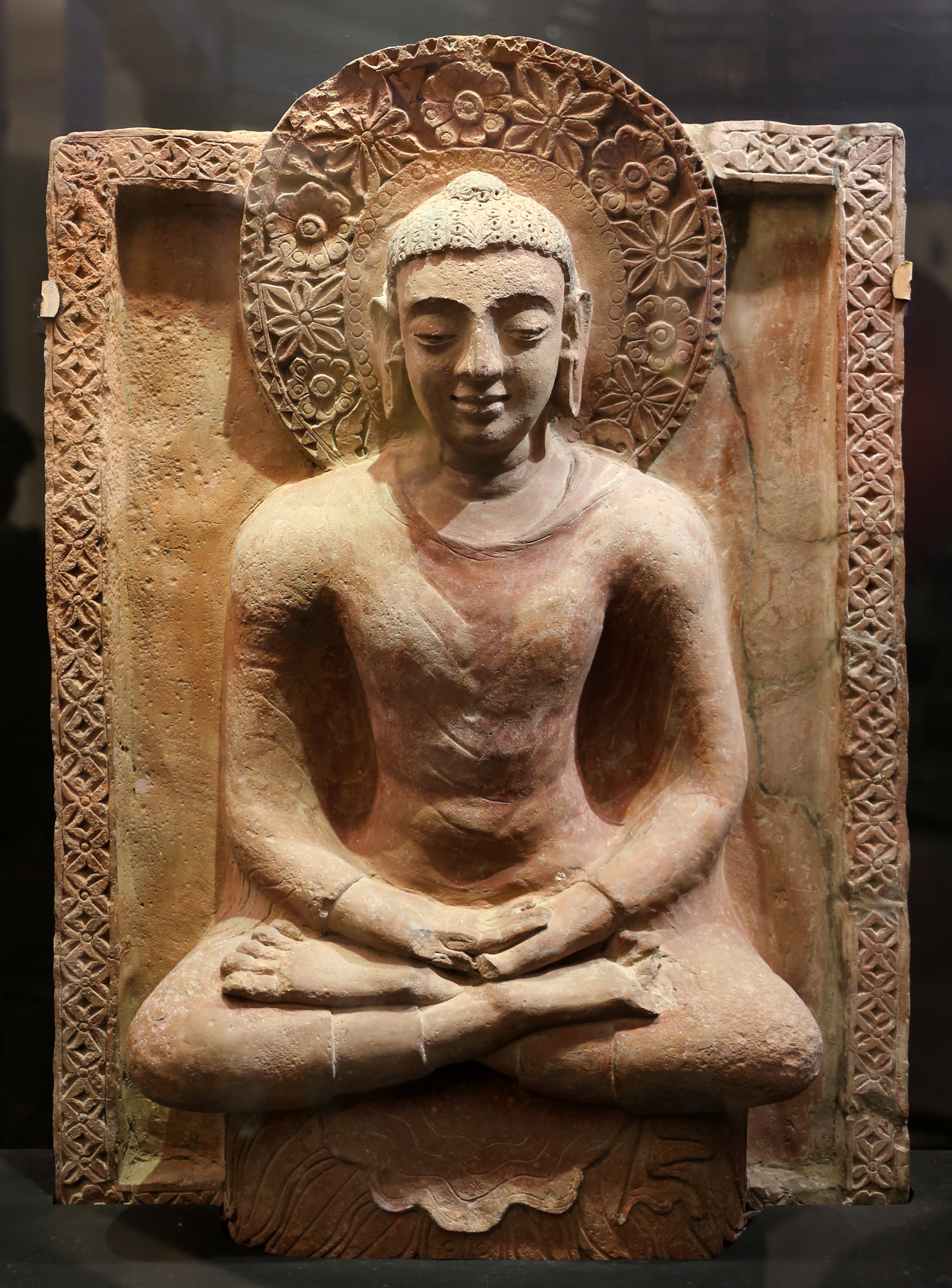
Buddha from the Kahu-Jo-Darro stupa at Mirpur Khas, Sindh, circa 410 CE. This is a conflation of the Greco-Buddhist art of Gandhara, and Gupta art.

== Sculpture in metal ==
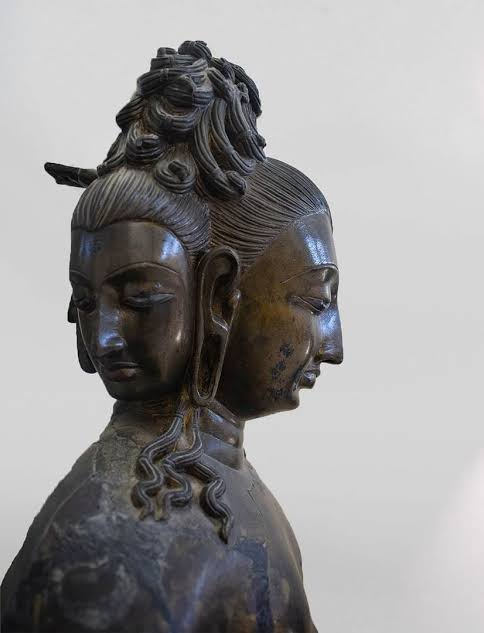
The Brahma from Mirpur-Khas, detail

The over life-size copper Sultanganj Buddha (2.3 metres tall) is "the only remaining metal statue of any size" from the Gupta period, out of what was at the time probably approximately as numerous a type as stone or stucco statues. There are, however, many much smaller near-identical figures (up to about 50 cm tall), several in American museums. The metal Brahma from Mirpur-Khas is older, but about half the size of the Sultanganj figure. The Jain Akota bronzes and some other finds are much smaller still, probably figures for shrines in well-off homes.

The style of the Sultanganj figure, made by lost-wax casting, is comparable to slightly earlier stone Buddha figures from Sarnath in "the smoothly rounded attenuation of body and limbs" and the very thin, clinging body garment, indicated in the lightest of ways. The figure has "a feeling of animation imparted by the unbalanced stance and the movement suggested by the sweeping silhouette of the enveloping robe".

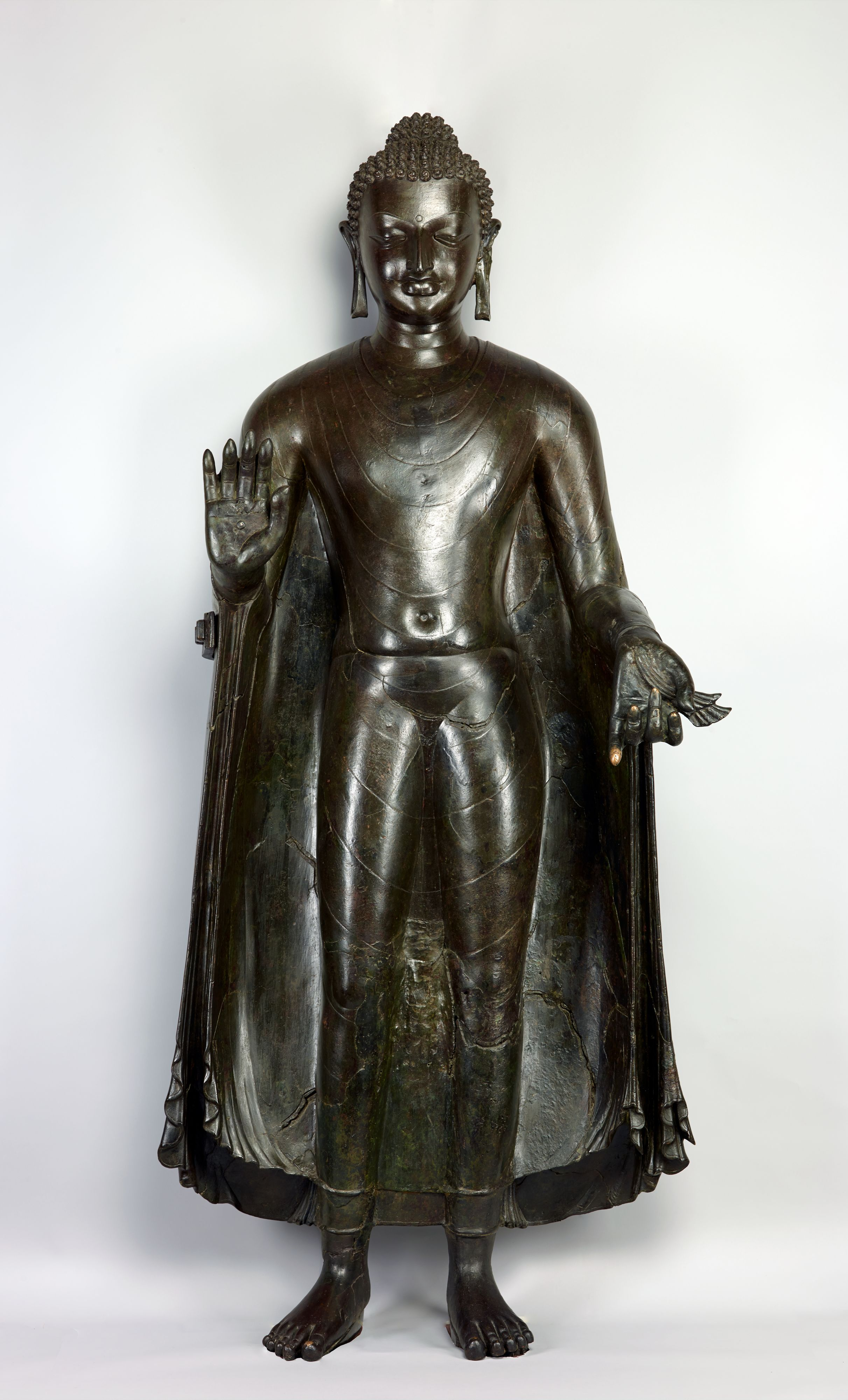
Sultanganj Buddha in copper, 500–700 CE, 2.3 metres tall. Birmingham Museum and Art Gallery.

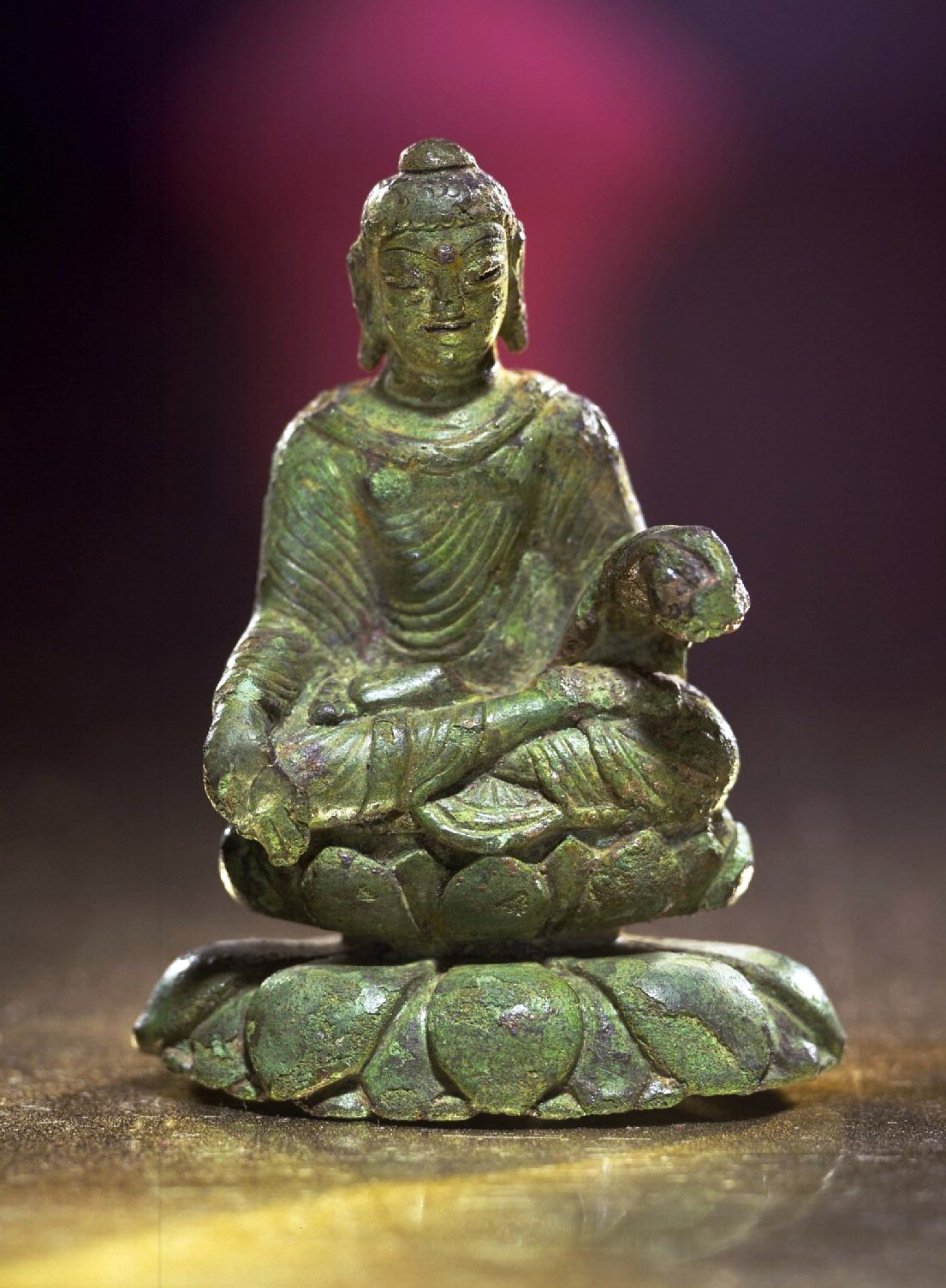
The Gupta bronze Helgö Buddha reached Sweden along the Silk Road, between the 6th and 8th century CE.

== Coins and metalwork ==
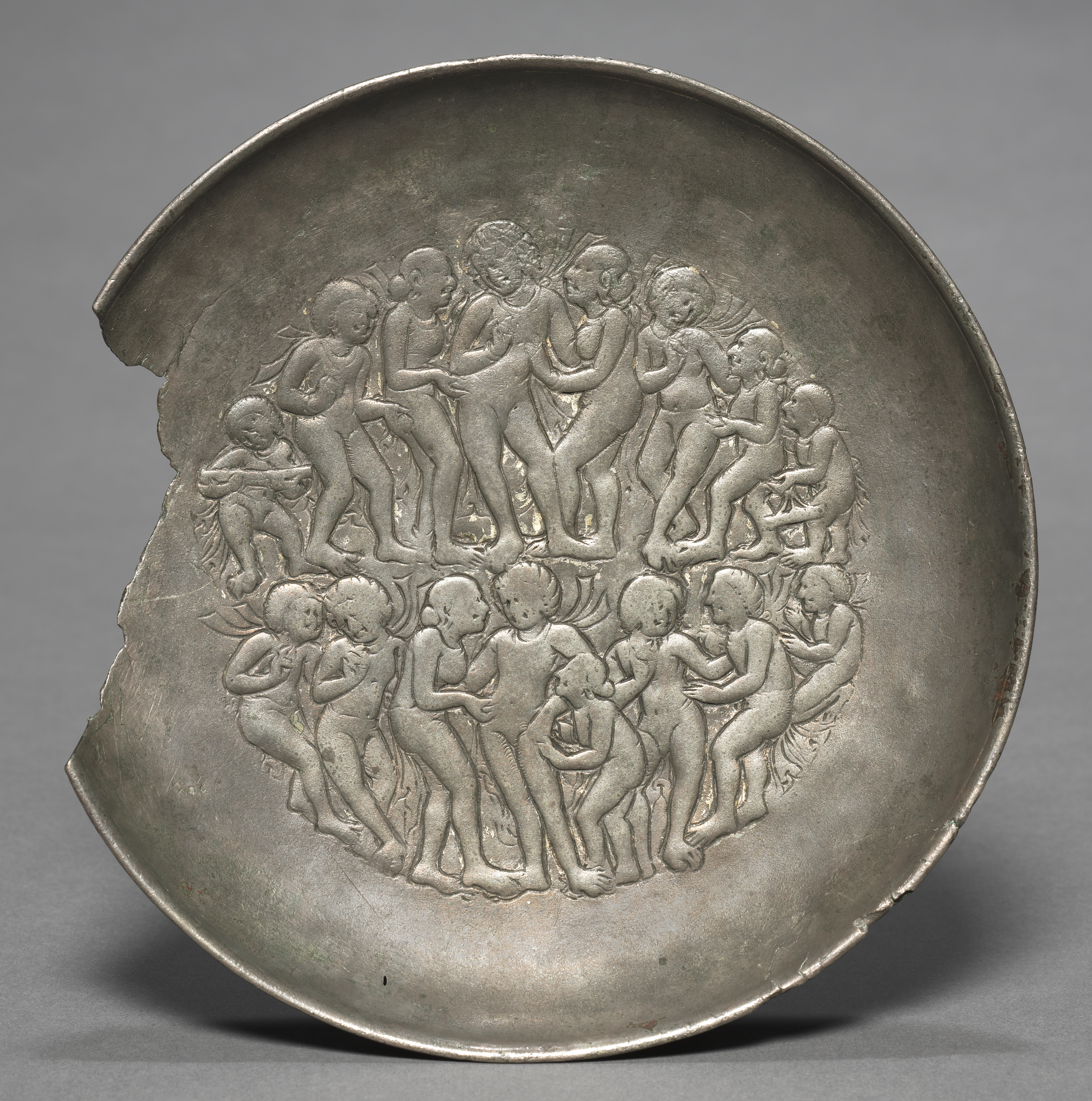
Silver plate with a festival scene

Survivals of decorated secular metalwork are very rare, but a silver plate in the Cleveland Museum of Art shows a crowded festival scene in rather worn relief. There is also a highly decorated object in bronzed iron that is thought to be a weight for an architect's "plummet" or measuring line, now in the British Museum.

The gold coinage of the Guptas, with its many types and infinite varieties and its inscriptions in Sanskrit, are regarded as the finest coins in a purely Indian style. The Gupta Empire produced large numbers of gold coins depicting the Gupta kings performing various rituals, as well as silver coins clearly influenced by those of the earlier Western Satraps by Chandragupta II.

=== Coinage ===
Gupta coinage only started with the reign of Samudragupta (335/350-375 CE), or possibly at the end of the reign of his father Chandragupta I, for whom only one coin type in his name is known ("Chandragupta I and his queen"), probably a commemorative issue minted by his son. The coinage of the Gupta Empire was initially derived from the coinage of the Kushan Empire, adopting its weight standard, techniques and designs, following the conquests of Samudragupta in the northwest. The Guptas even adopted from the Kushans the name of Dinara for their coinage, which ultimately came from the Roman name Denarius aureus. The imagery on Gupta coins was initially derived from Kushan types, but the features soon became more Indian in both style and subject matter compared to earlier dynasties, where Greco-Roman and Persian styles were mostly followed.

The usual layout is an obverse with a portrait of the king that is normally full-length, whether standing, seated or riding a horse, and on the reverse a goddess, most often seated on a throne. Often the king is sacrificing. The choice of images can have political meaning, referring to conquests and local tastes; the types often vary between parts of the empire.

Types showing the king hunting and killing various animals: lions (the "lion-slayer" type), tigers and rhinoceros very likely refer to new conquests in the areas where those animals were still found. They may also reflect influence from Sassanian silverware from Persia. The king standing and holding a bow to one side (the "archer" type) was used by at least eight kings; it may have been intended to associate the king with Rama. Profile heads of the king are used on some silver coins for Western provinces added to the empire.

Some gold coins commemorate the Vedic Ashvamedha horse sacrifice ritual, which the Gupta kings practised; these have the sacrificial horse on the obverse and the queen on the reverse. Samudragupta is shown playing a string instrument, wearing huge earrings, but only a simple dhoti. The only type produced under Chandragupta I shows him and his queen standing side by side. The bird Garuda, bearer of Vishnu, is used as a symbol of the dynasty on many silver coins. Some of these were in the past misidentified as fire altars.

The silver coinage of the Guptas was made in imitation of the coinage of the Western Satraps following their overthrow by Chandragupta II, inserting the Gupta peacock symbol on the reverse but retaining traces of the Greek legend and the ruler's portrait on the obverse. Kumaragupta and Skandagupta continued with the old type of coins (the Garuda and the Peacock types) and also introduced some other new types. The copper coinage was mostly confined to the era of Chandragupta II and was more original in design. Eight out of the nine types known to have been struck by him have a figure of Garuda and the name of the king on it. The gradual deterioration in design and execution of the gold coins and the disappearance of silver money, bear ample evidence to their curtailed territory.

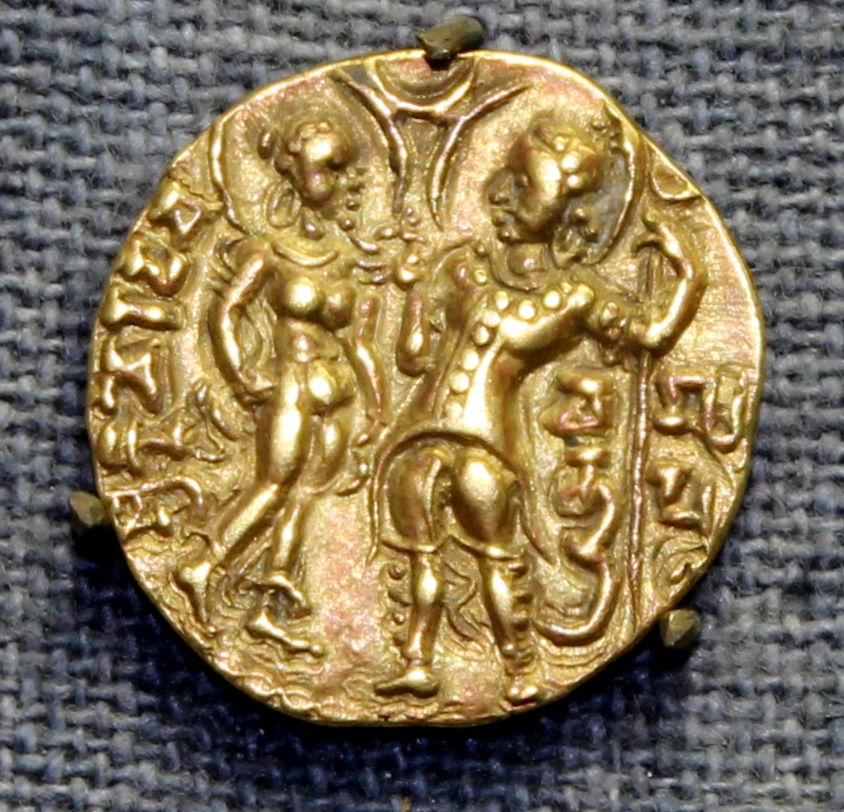
Chandragupta I and his queen

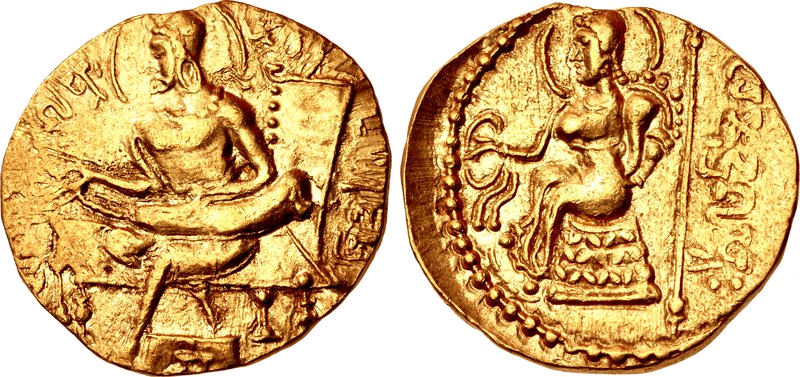
Samudragupta (left) playing a musical instrument; Goddess, right, c 335-380

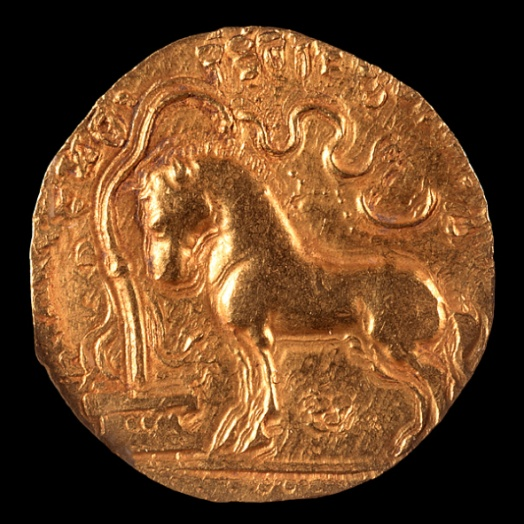
Samudragupta coin with Ashvamedha horse standing in front of a yūpa sacrificial post, with legend "The King of Kings, who had performed the Ashvamedha sacrifice, wins heaven after conquering the earth".

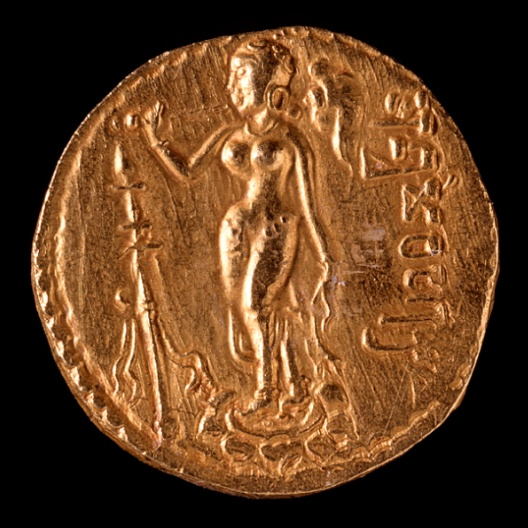
The queen, reverse of last, is holding a chowrie for the fanning of the horse and a needle-like pointed instrument, with legend "One powerful enough to perform the Ashvamedha sacrifice".

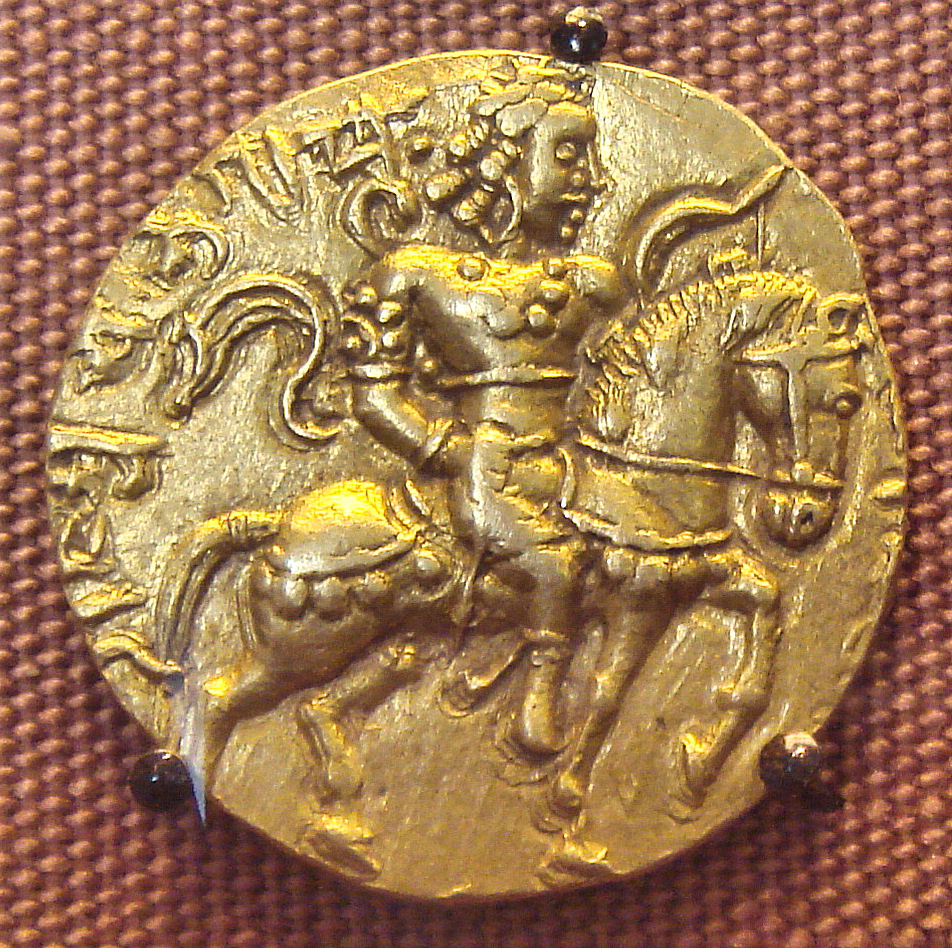
Chandragupta II on horse

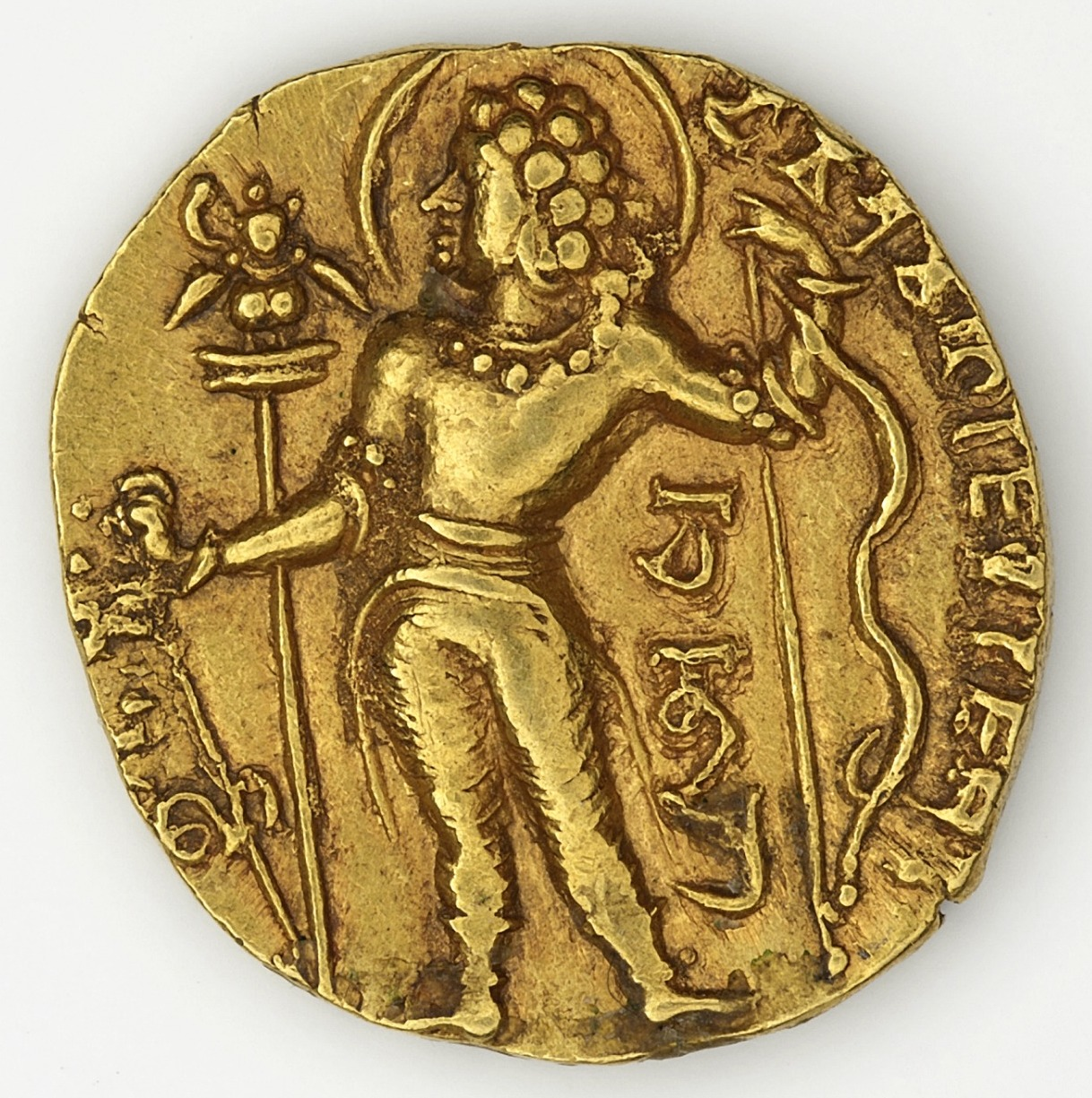
Archer type of Chandragupta II

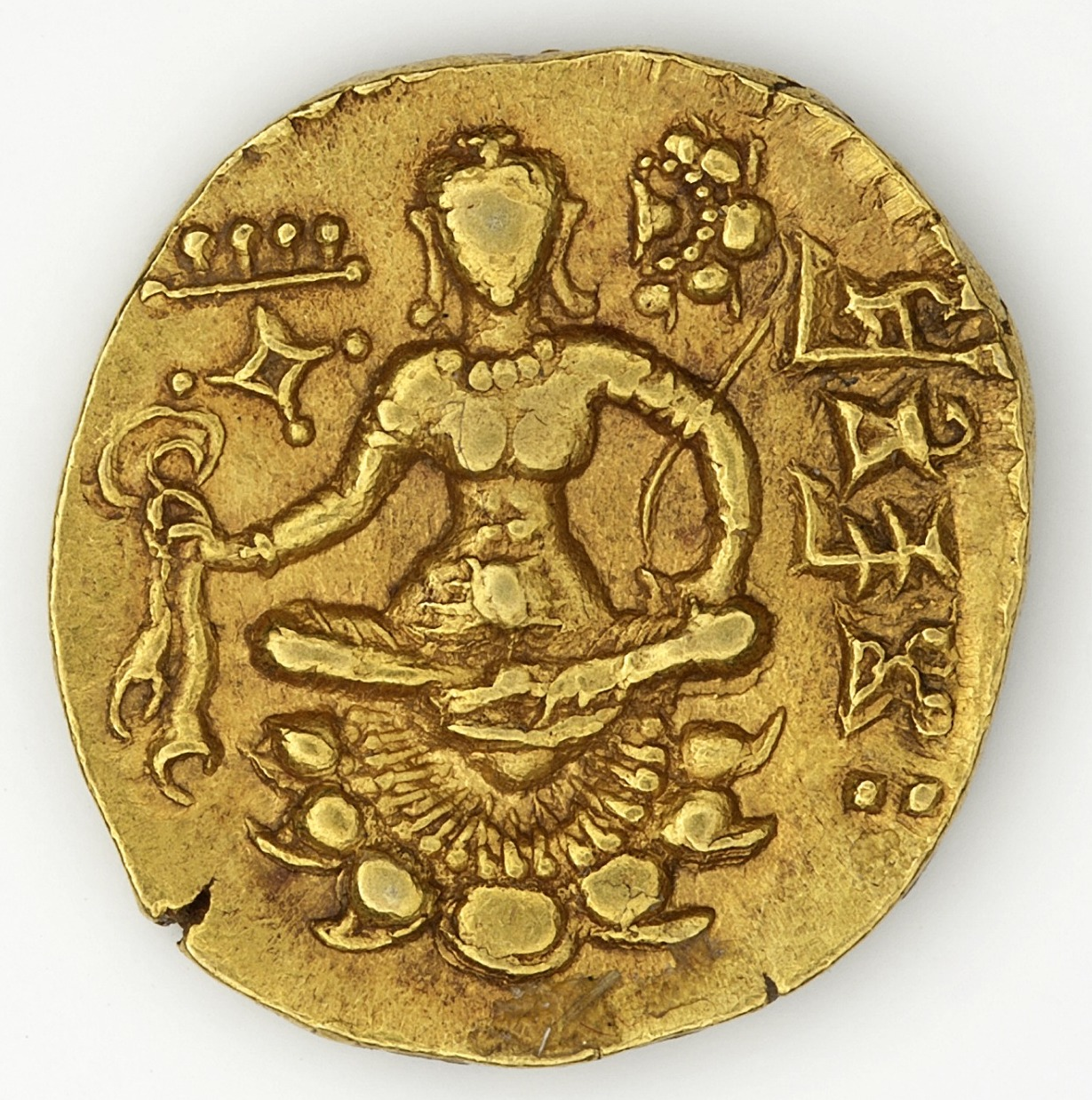
Reverse of last; goddess seated on a lotus

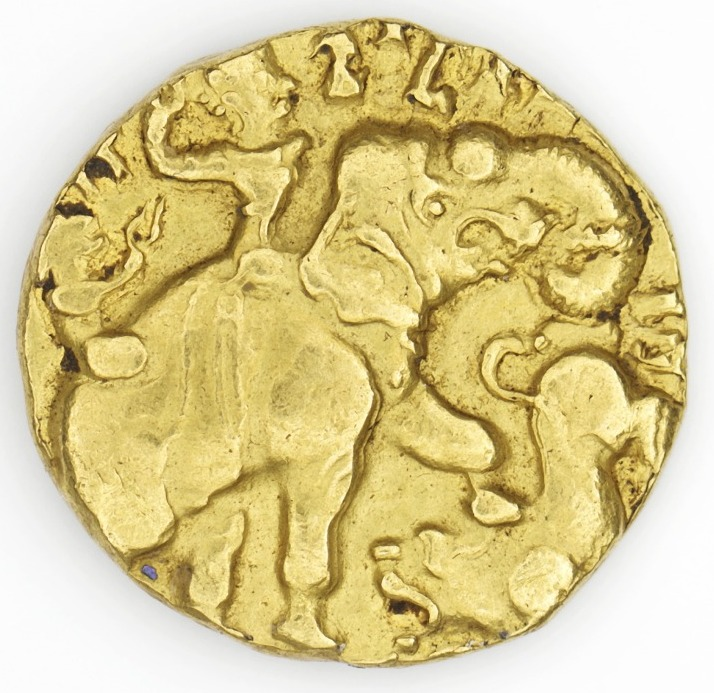
Kumaragupta I lion hunting on an elephant,

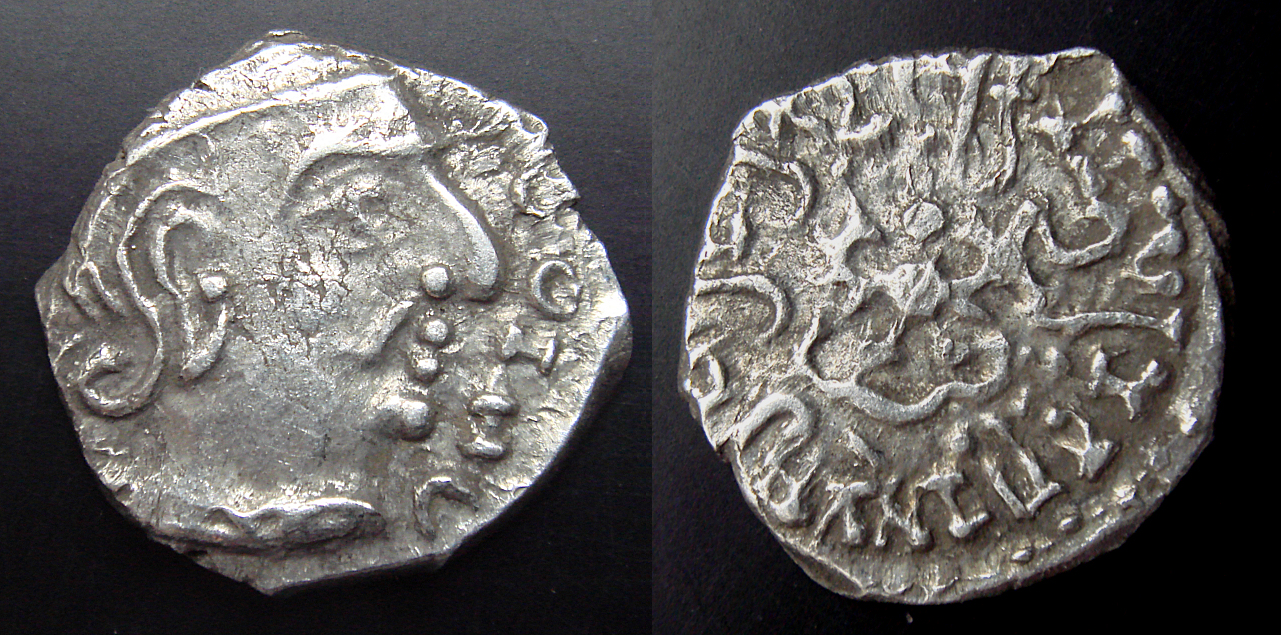
Coin of Gupta ruler Chandragupta II (r.380–415) in the style of the Western Satraps.

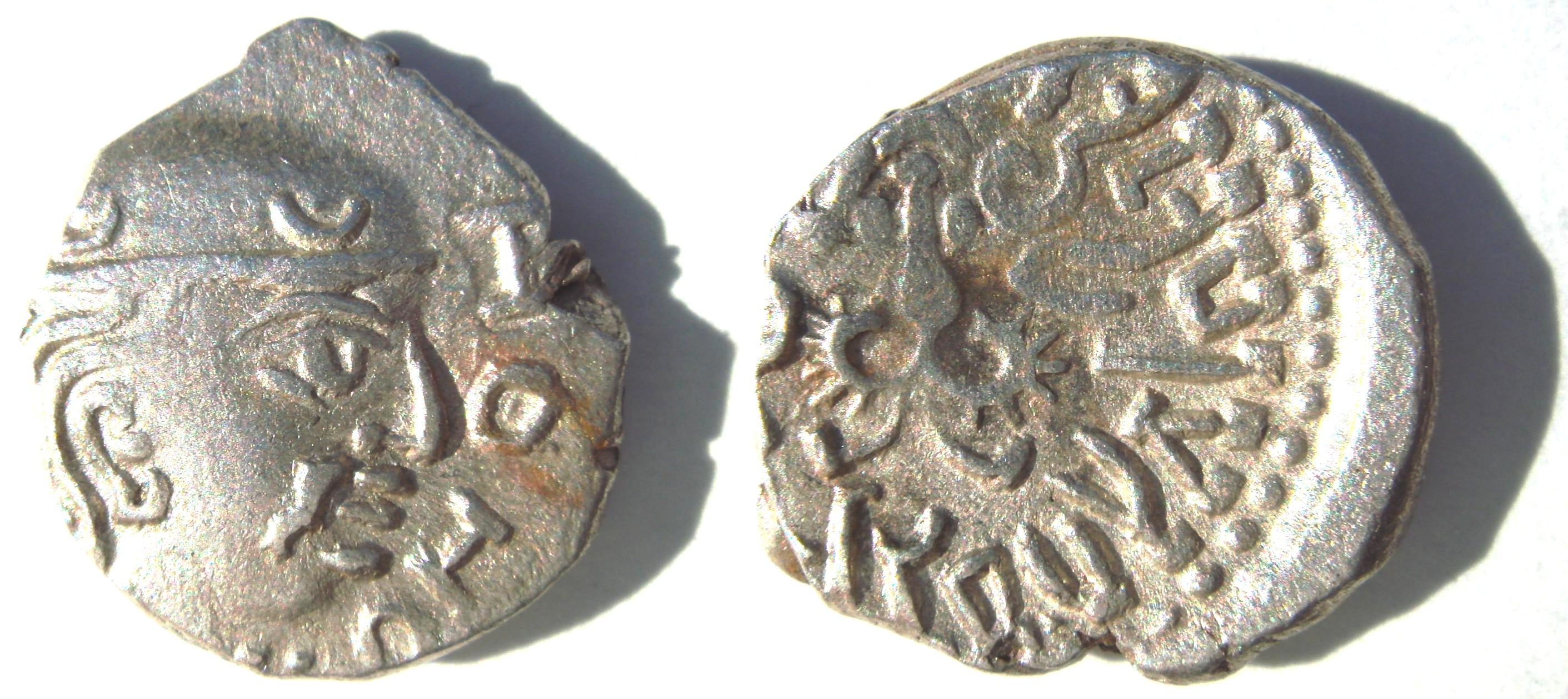
Coin of Gupta ruler Kumaragupta I (r.414–455) (Western territories).

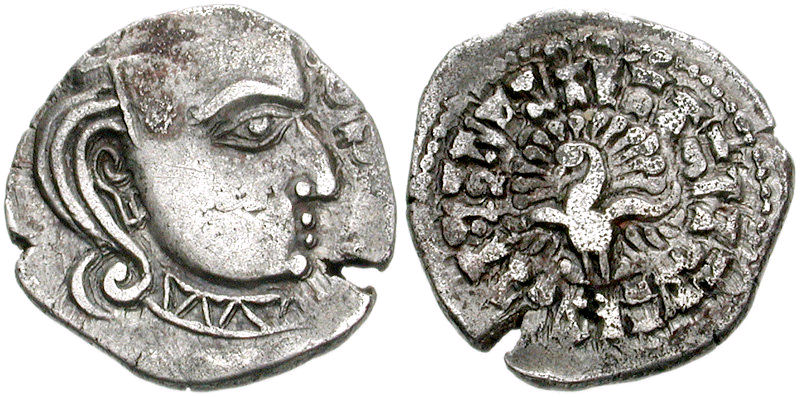
Silver head of Skandagupta, peacock on reverse, 455-467. Style of the Western Satraps.

== Architecture ==
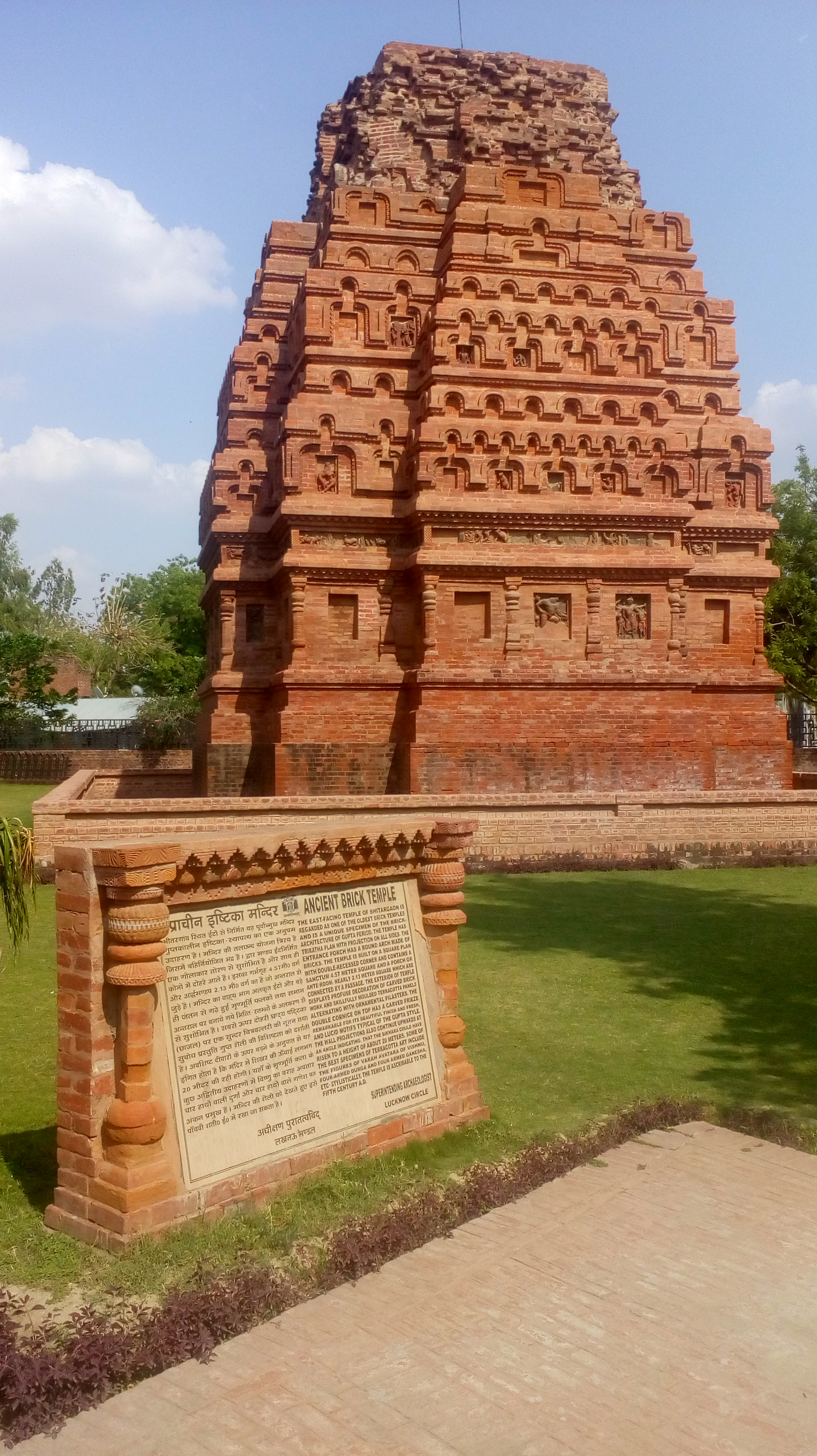
Hindu temple of Bhitargaon, late 5th century, but considerably restored.

For reasons that are not entirely clear, for the most part the Gupta period represented a hiatus in Indian rock-cut architecture, with the first wave of construction finishing before the empire was assembled, and the second wave beginning in the late 5th century, just as it was ending. This is the case, for example, at the Ajanta Caves, with an early group made by 220 CE at the latest, and a later one probably all after about 460. Instead, the period has left almost the first surviving free-standing structures in India, in particular the beginnings of Hindu temple architecture. As Milo Beach puts it: "Under the Guptas, India was quick to join the rest of the medieval world in a passion for housing precious objects in stylized architectural frameworks", the "precious objects" being primarily the icons of gods.

The most famous remaining monuments in a broadly Gupta style, the caves at Ajanta, Elephanta, and Ellora (respectively Buddhist, Hindu, and mixed including Jain) were in fact produced under other dynasties in Central India, and in the case of Ellora after the Gupta period, but primarily reflect the monumentality and balance of Guptan style. Ajanta contains by far the most significant survivals of painting from this and the surrounding periods, showing a mature form which had probably had a long development, mainly in painting palaces. The Hindu Udayagiri Caves actually record connections with the dynasty and its ministers, and the Dashavatara Temple at Deogarh is a major temple, one of the earliest to survive, with important sculpture, although it has lost its mandapa and covered ambulatory for parikrama.

Examples of early North Indian Hindu temples that have survived after the Udayagiri Caves in Madhya Pradesh include those at Tigawa (early 5th century), Pataini temple (5th century), Sanchi Temple 17 (similar, but respectively Hindu and Buddhist), Deogarh, Parvati Temple, Nachna (465), Bhitargaon, the largest Gupta brick temple to survive, and Lakshman Brick Temple, Sirpur (600–625 CE). Gop Temple in Gujarat (c. 550 or later) is an oddity, with no surviving close comparator.

There are a number of different broad models, which would continue to be the case for more than a century after the Gupta period, but temples such as Tigawa and Sanchi Temple 17, which are small but massively built stone prostyle buildings with a sanctuary and a columned porch, show the most common basic plan that is elaborated in later temples to the present day. Both of these have flat roofs over the sanctuary, which would become uncommon by about the 8th century. The Mahabodhi Temple, Bhitargaon, Deogarh and Gop already all show high superstructures of different shapes. The Chejarla Kapoteswara temple demonstrates that free-standing chaitya-hall temples with barrel roofs continued to be built, probably with many smaller examples in wood.

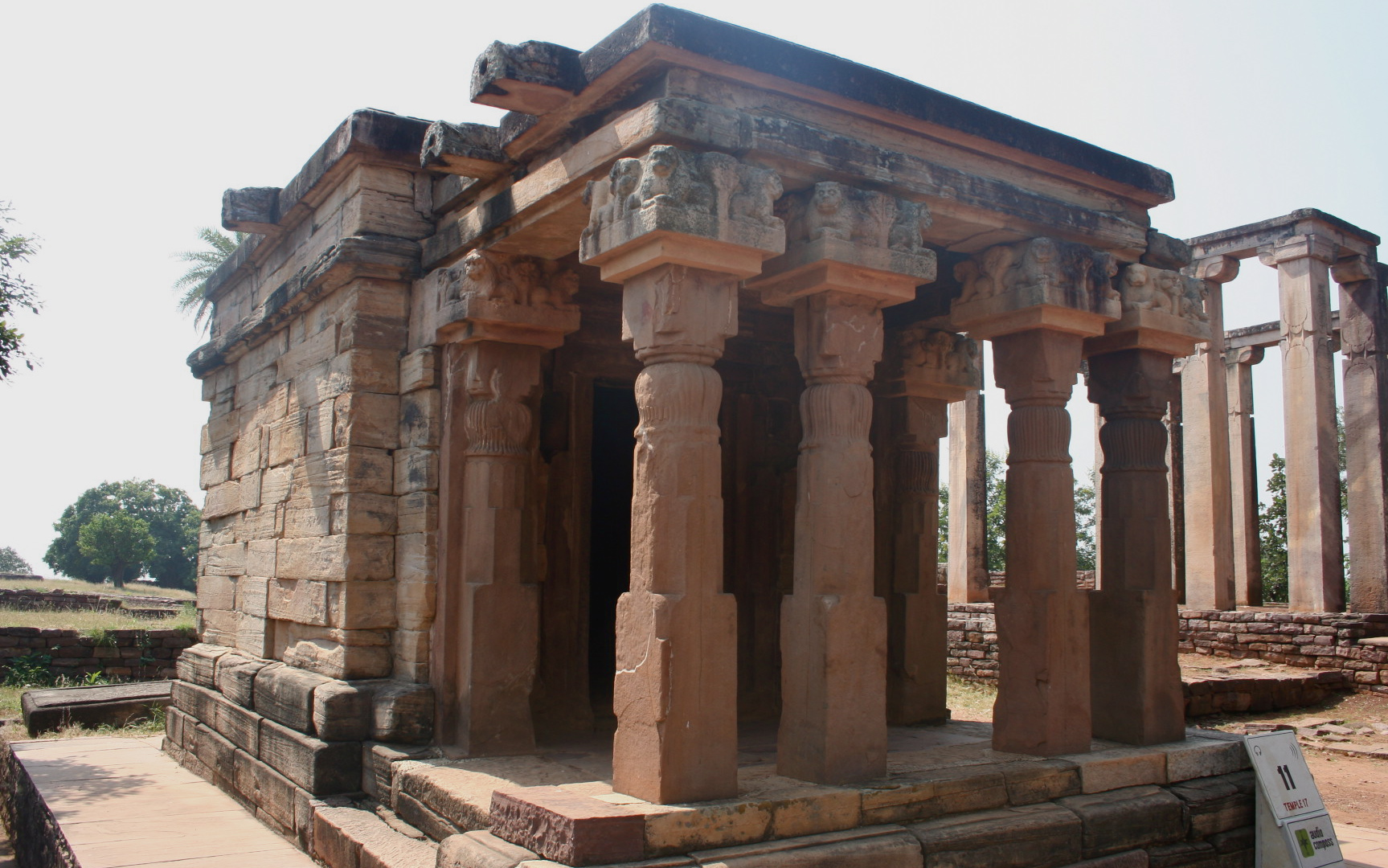
Tetrastyle prostyle Gupta period Temple 17 at Sanchi, typical of the evolving Hindu temple. Maurya

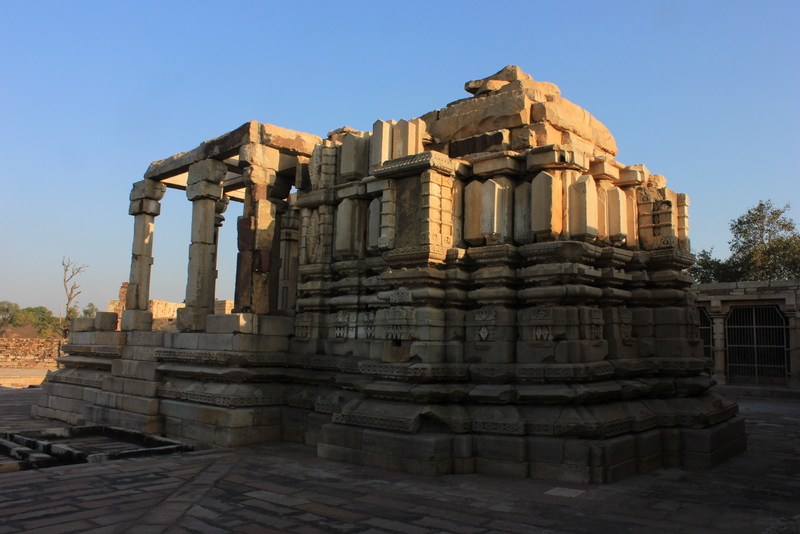
Garhwa fort, a hindu temple complex belonging to the Gupta Period, 5th-6th century.

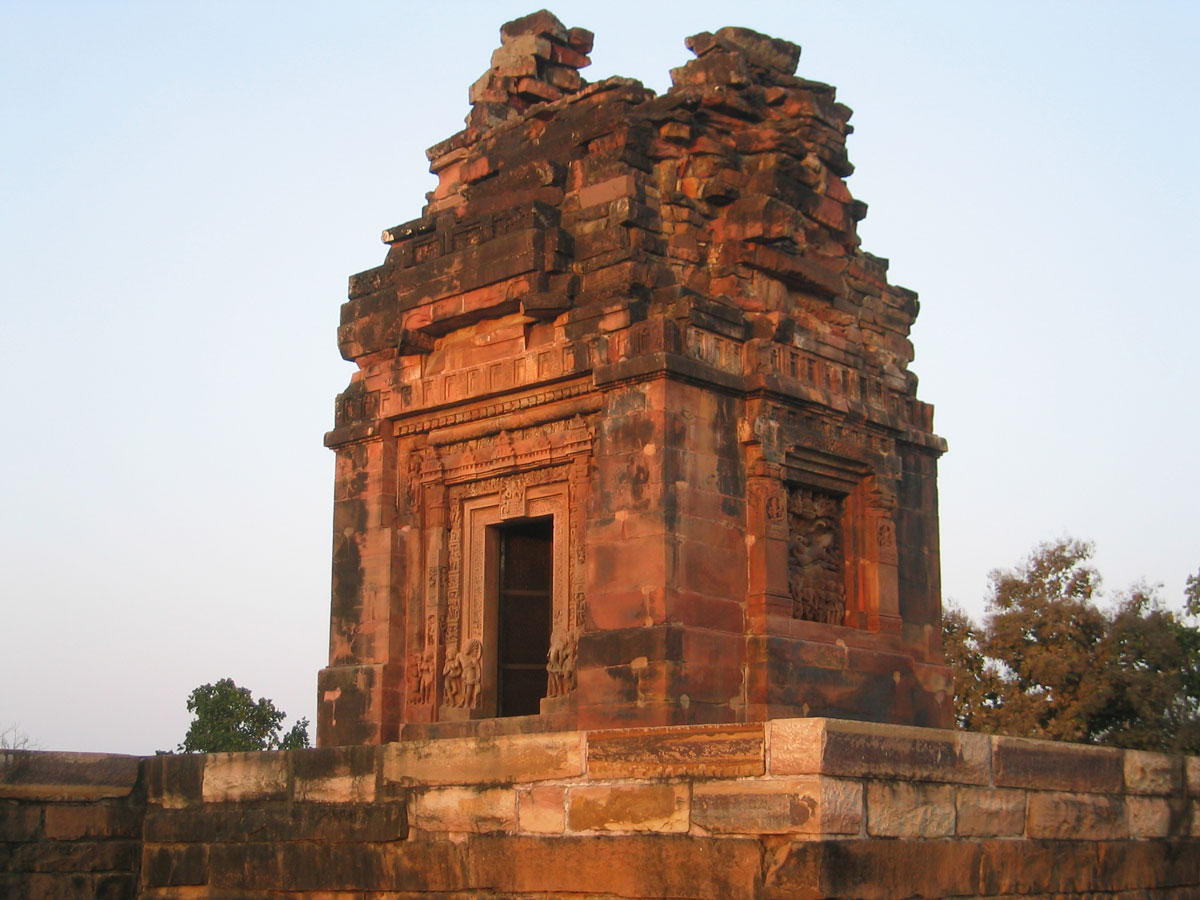
Dashavatara Temple, Deogarh, a 6th-century Vishnu temple, originally with a mandapa and covered ambulatory.

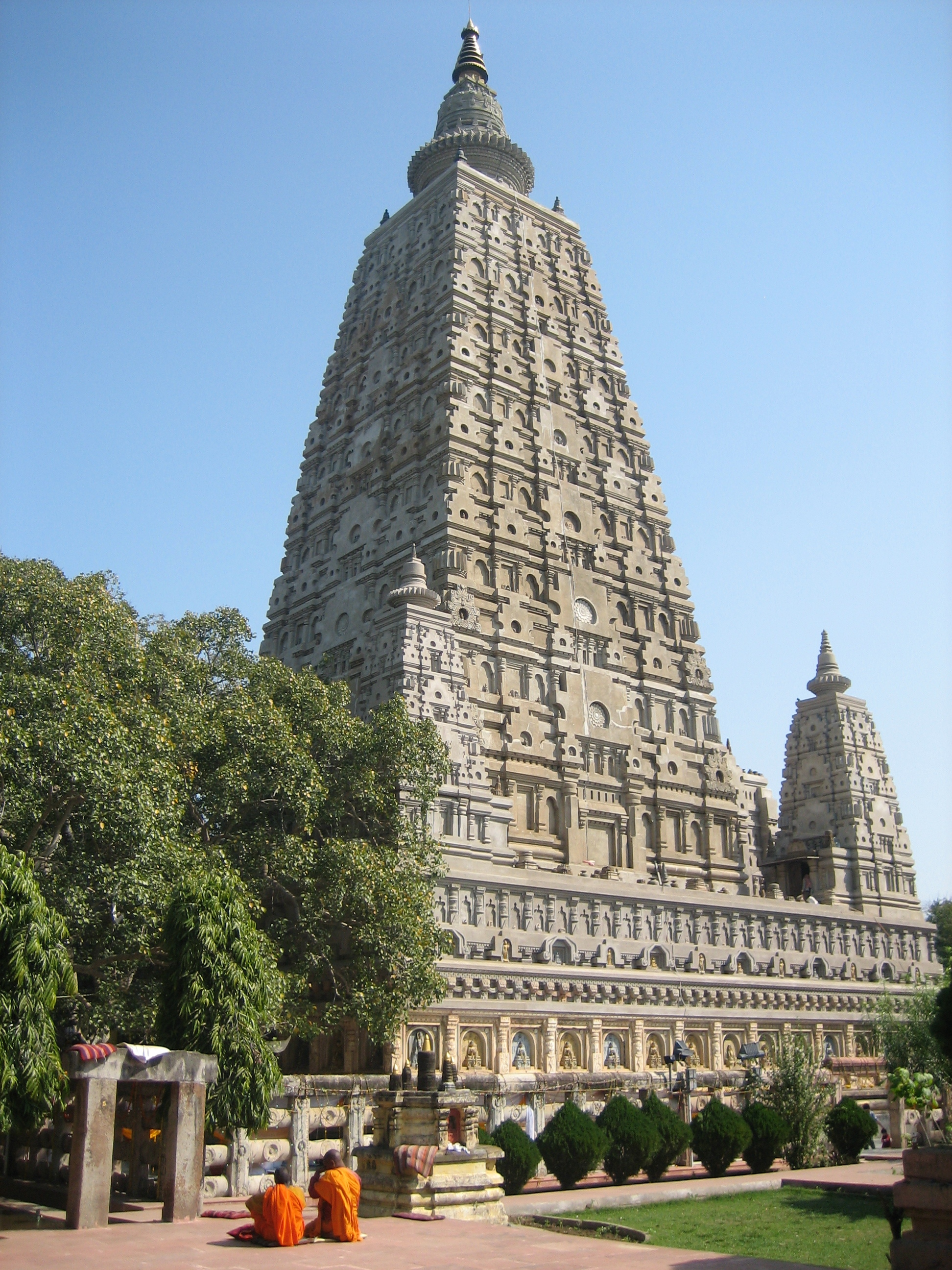
The current structure of the Mahabodhi Temple dates to the Gupta era, 5th century. Marking the location where the Buddha is said to have attained enlightenment.

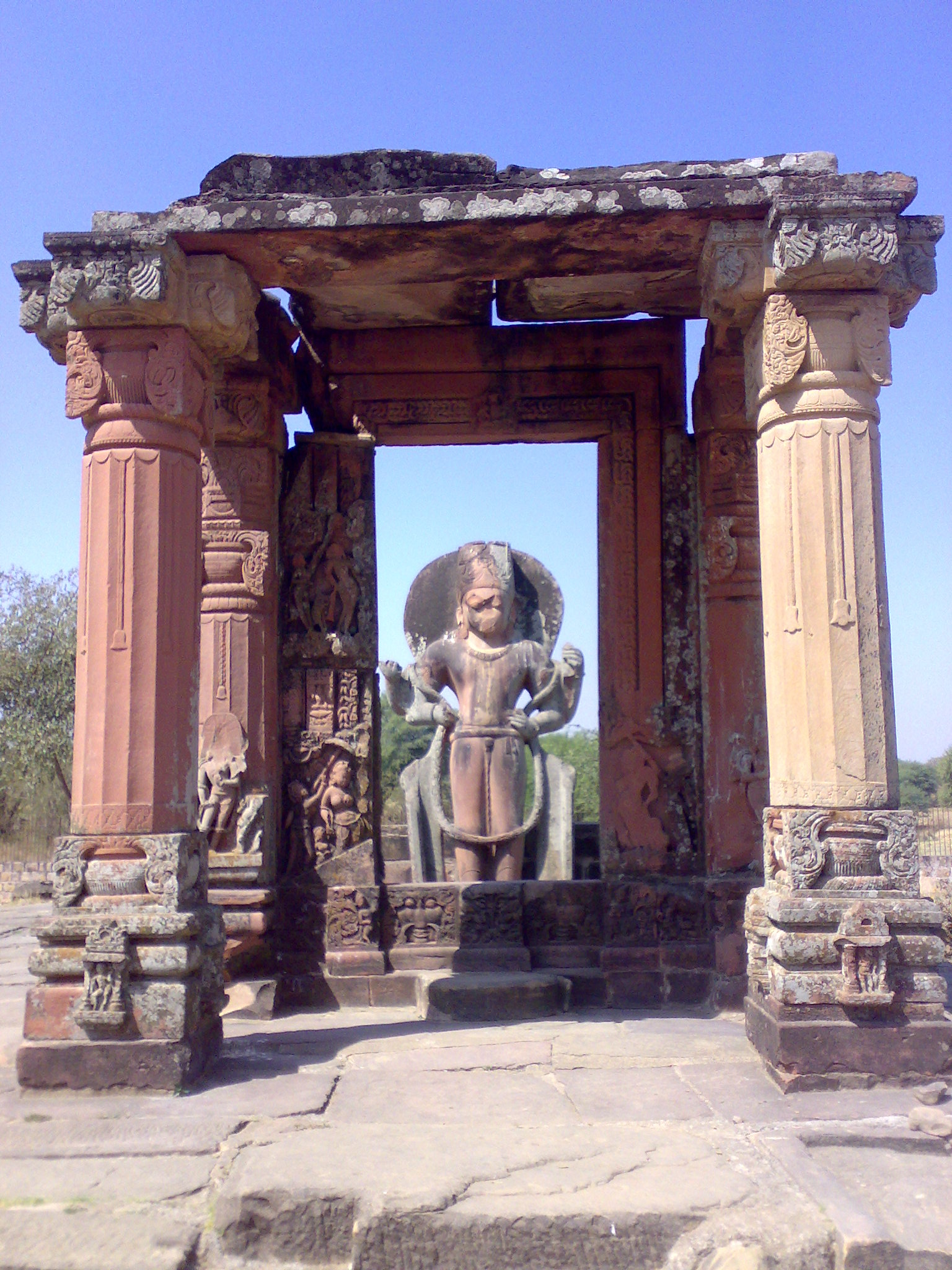
Vishnu temple in Eran, late 5th century.

Pataini temple is a Jain temple built during the Gupta period, 5th century

=== Pillars ===
Pillars with inscriptions were erected, recording the main achievements of Gupta rulers. Whereas the Pillars of Ashoka were cylindrical, smooth and finished with the famous Mauryan polish, Gupta pillars had a rough surface often shaped into geometrical facets.

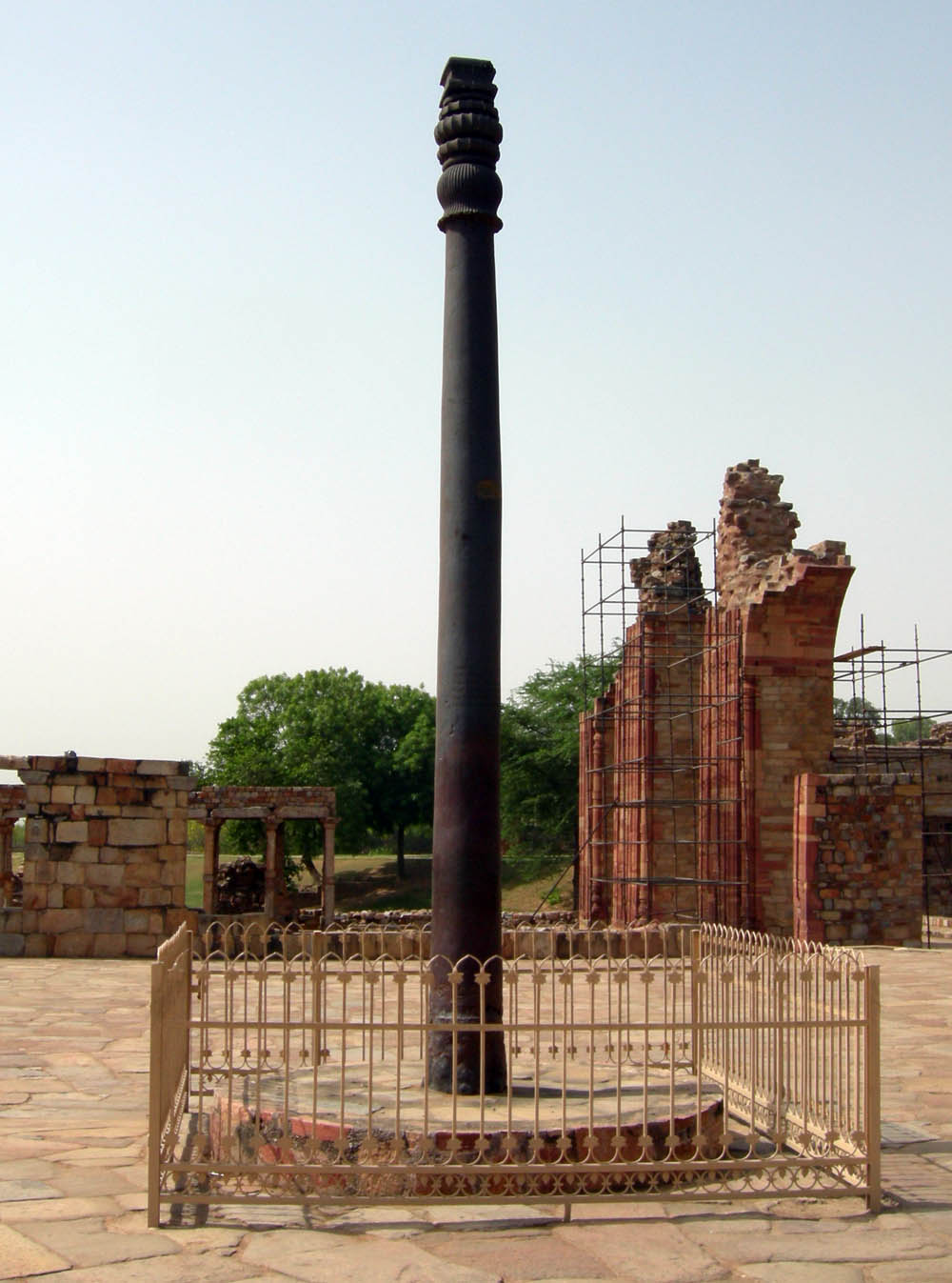
The iron pillar of Delhi, which features an inscription of Chandragupta II (c.375-415 CE)

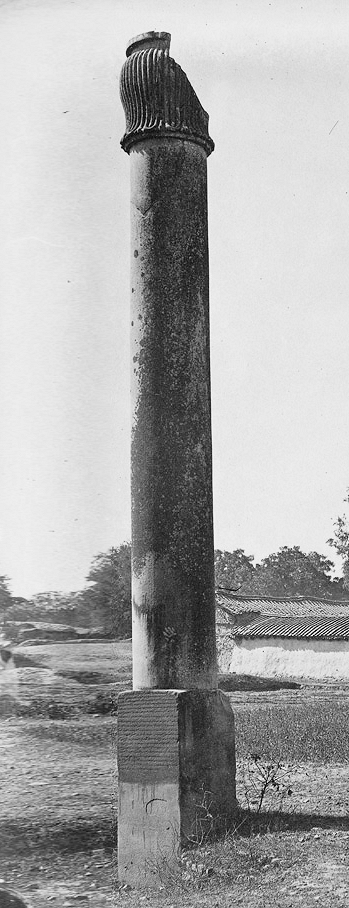
The Bhitari pillar of Skandagupta (c.455–c.467 CE)

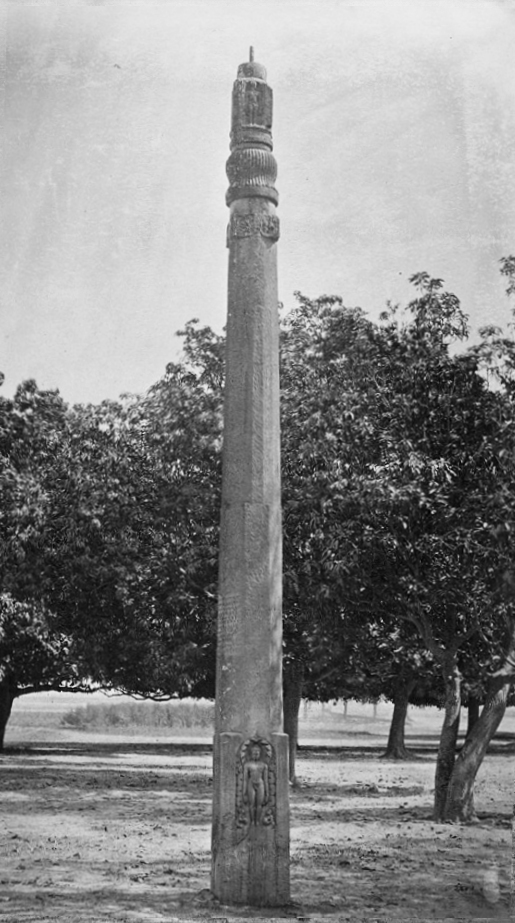
The Jain Kahaum pillar of Skandagupta (461 CE)

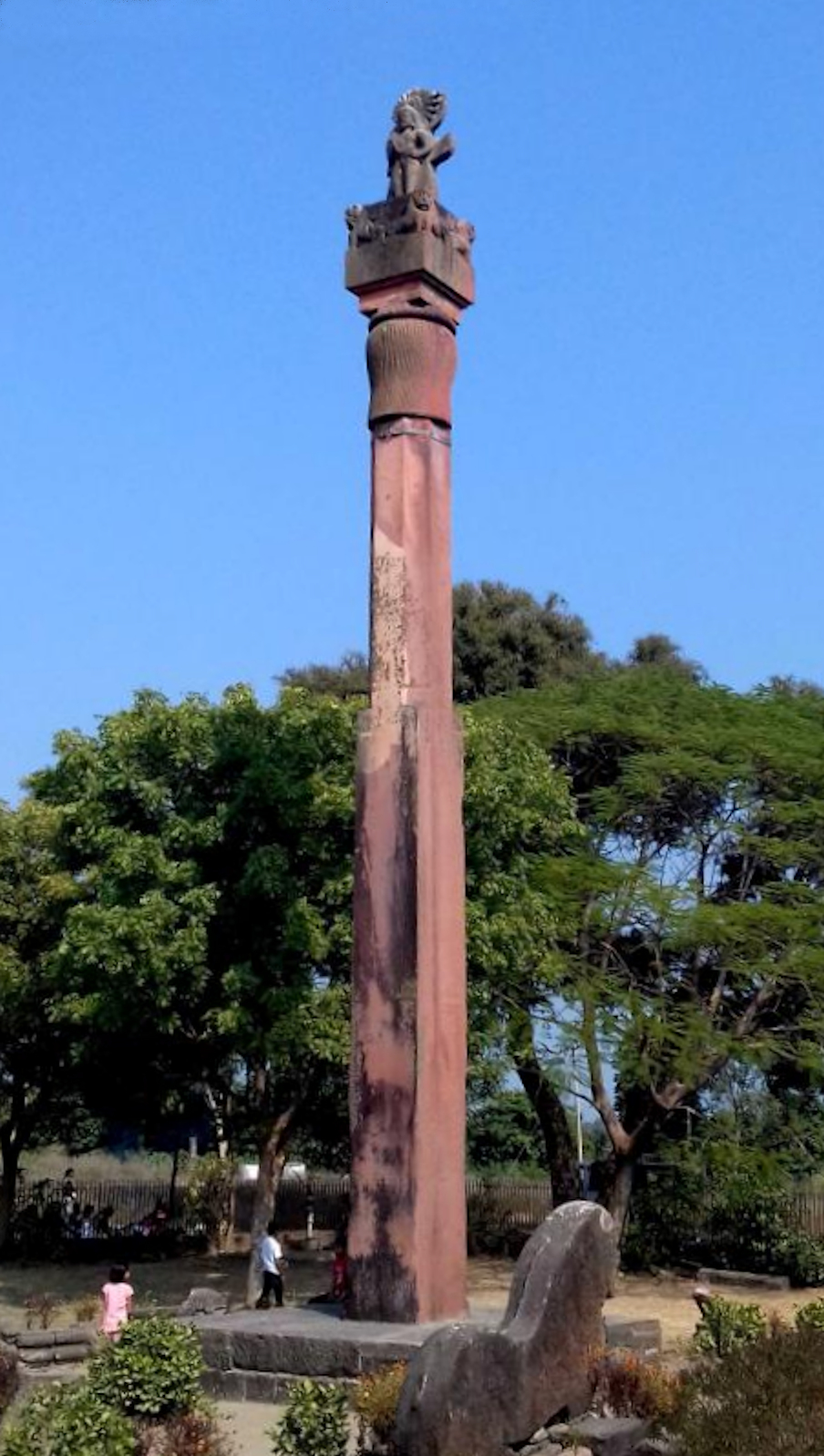
The Buddhagupta pillar at Eran, 484/5

== Painting ==
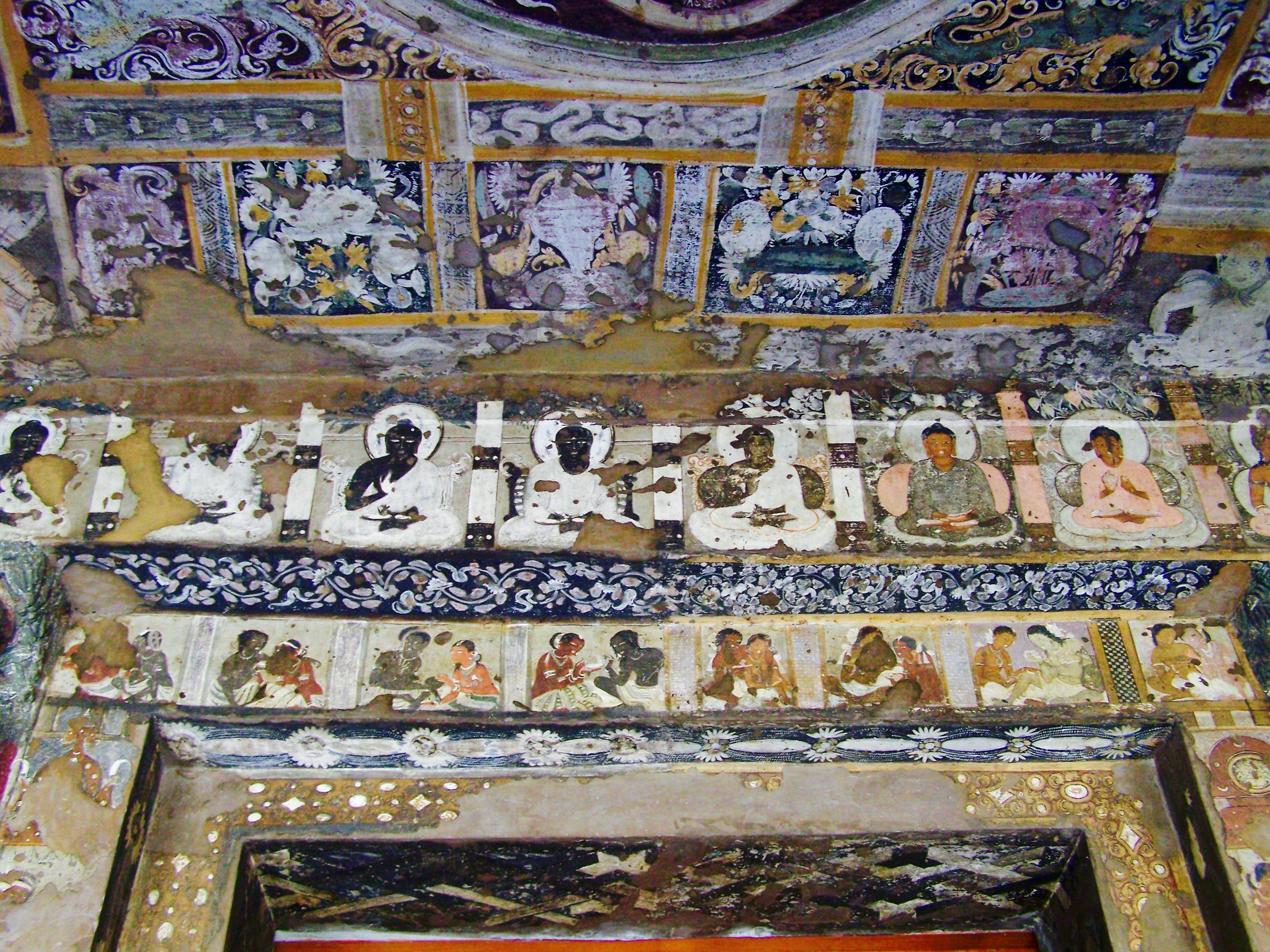
Ajanta cave 17, frescoes above a lintel

Painting was evidently a major art in Gupta times, and the varied paintings of the Ajanta Caves, which are much the best survivals (almost the only ones), show a very mature style and technique, clearly the result of a well-developed tradition. Indeed, it is recorded that skill in amateur painting, especially portraits, was considered a desirable accomplishment among Gupta elites, including royalty. Ajanta was ruled by the powerful Vakataka dynasty, beyond the territory of the Gupta Empire, but it is thought to closely reflect the metropolitan Gupta style. The other survivals are from the Bagh Caves, now mostly removed to the Gujari Mahal Archaeological Museum in Gwalior Fort, Ellora, and Cave III of the Badami cave temples.

At Ajanta, it is thought that established teams of painters, used to decorating palaces and temples elsewhere, were brought in when required to decorate a cave. Mural paintings survive from both the earlier and later groups of the caves. Several fragments of murals preserved from the earlier caves (Caves 10 and 11) are effectively unique survivals of ancient painting in India from this period, and "show that by Sātavāhana times, if not earlier, the Indian painters had mastered an easy and fluent naturalistic style, dealing with large groups of people in a manner comparable to the reliefs of the Sāñcī toraņa crossbars".

Four of the later caves have large and relatively well-preserved mural paintings which "have come to represent Indian mural painting to the non-specialist", and represent "the great glories not only of Gupta but of all Indian art". They fall into two stylistic groups, with the most famous in Caves 16 and 17, and what used to thought of as later paintings in Caves 1 and 2. However, the widely accepted new chronology proposed by Spink places both groups in the 5th century, probably before 478.

The paintings are in "dry fresco", painted on top of a dry plaster surface rather than into wet plaster. All the paintings appear to be the work of painters supported by discriminating connoisseurship and sophisticated patrons from an urban atmosphere. Unlike much Indian mural painting, compositions are not laid out in horizontal bands like a frieze, but show large scenes spreading in all directions from a single figure or group at the centre. The ceilings are also painted with sophisticated and elaborate decorative motifs, many derived from sculpture. The paintings in cave 1, which according to Spink was commissioned by Harisena himself, concentrate on those Jataka tales which show previous lives of the Buddha as a king, rather than as a deer or elephant or other animal. The Ajanta paintings have seriously deteriorated since they were rediscovered in 1819, and are now mostly hard to appreciate at the site. A number of early attempts to copy them met with misfortune.

Only mural paintings survive, but it is clear from literary sources that portable paintings, including portraits, were common, probably including illustrated manuscripts.

Ajanta paintings

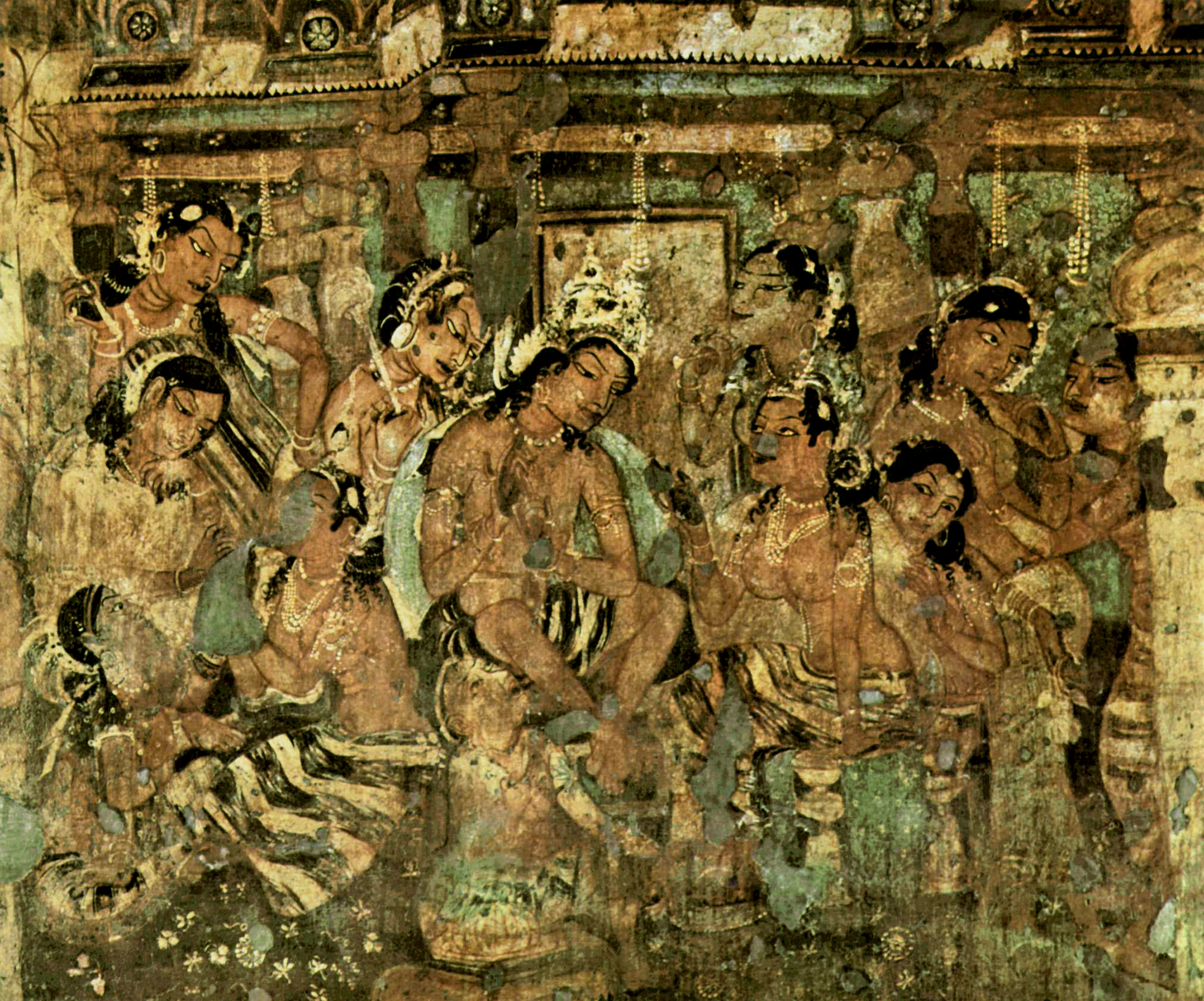
One of four frescos for the Mahajanaka Jataka tale. The king announces he abdicates to become an ascetic.

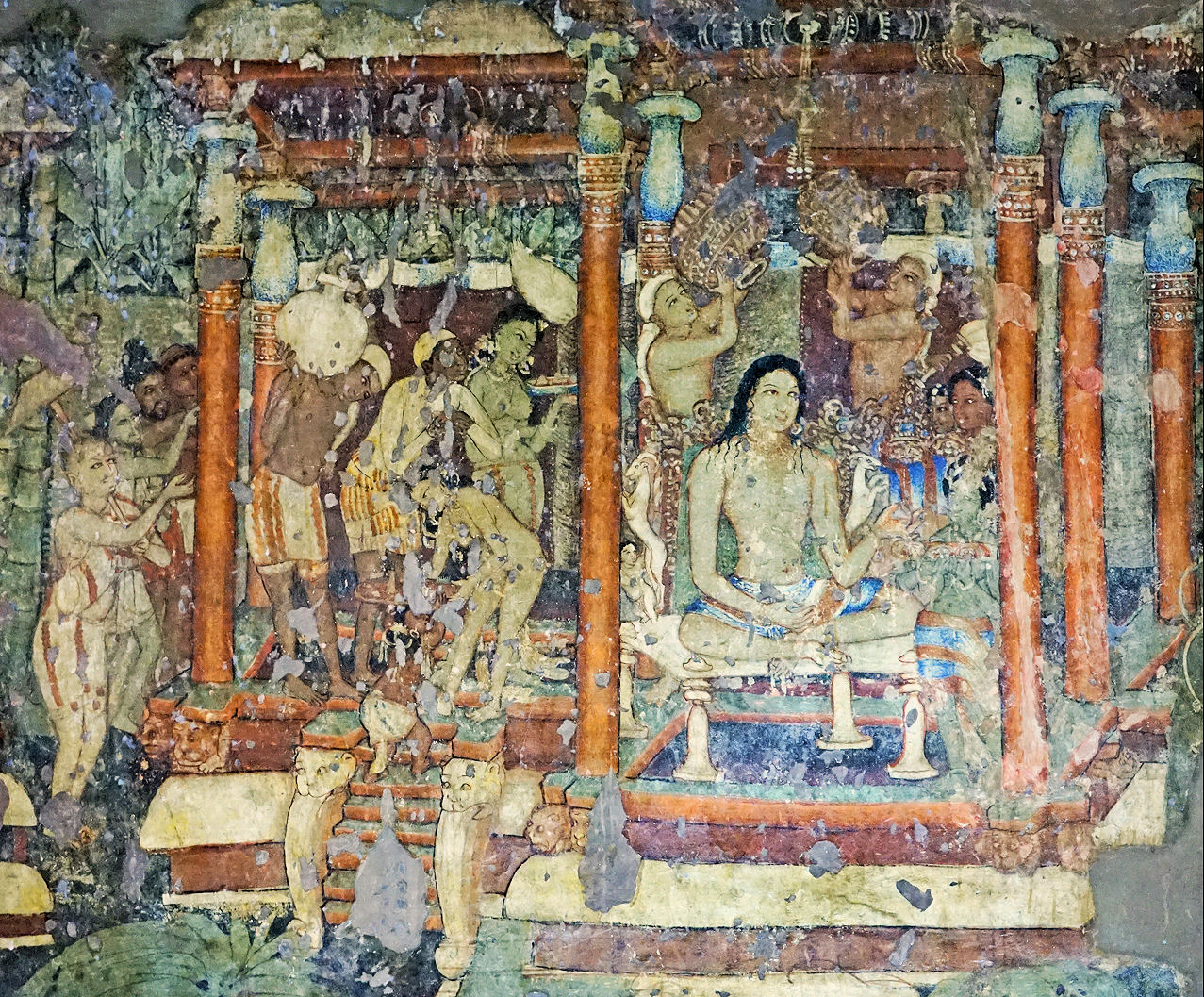
Sibi Jataka: king undergoes the traditional rituals for renouncers. He receives a ceremonial bath.

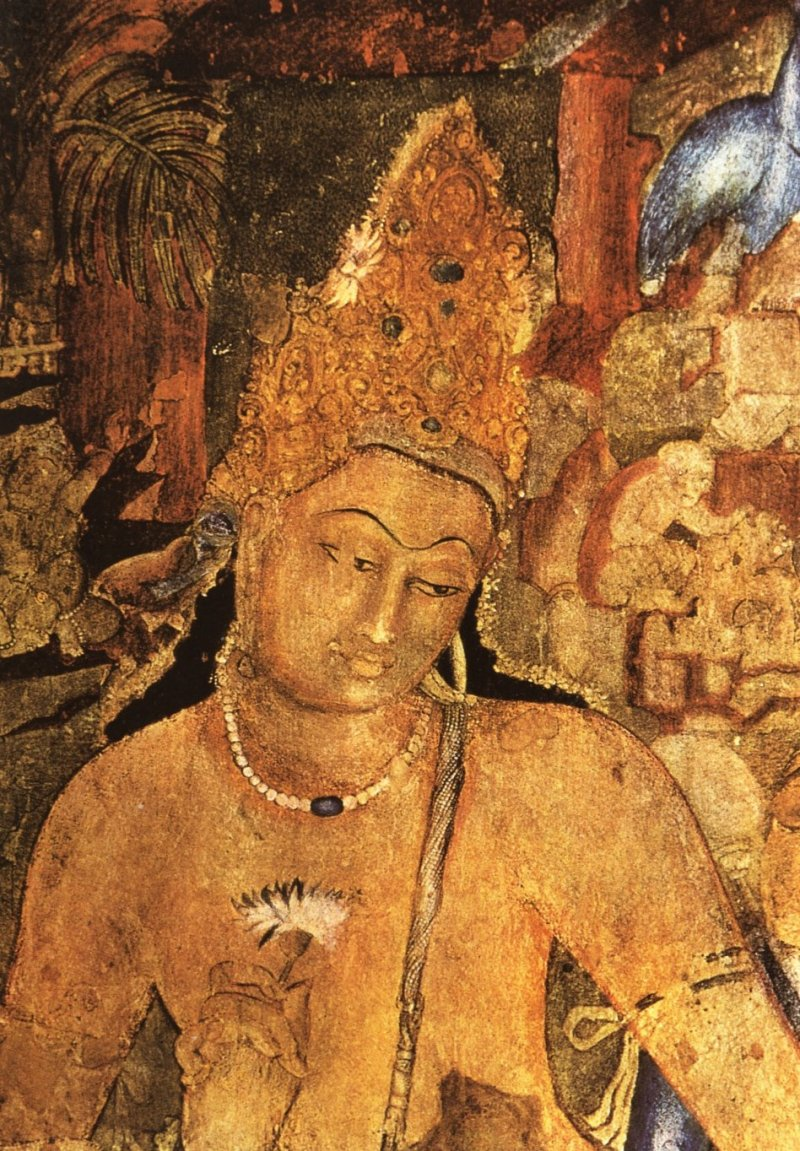
The Bodhisattva of compassion Padmapani with lotus.

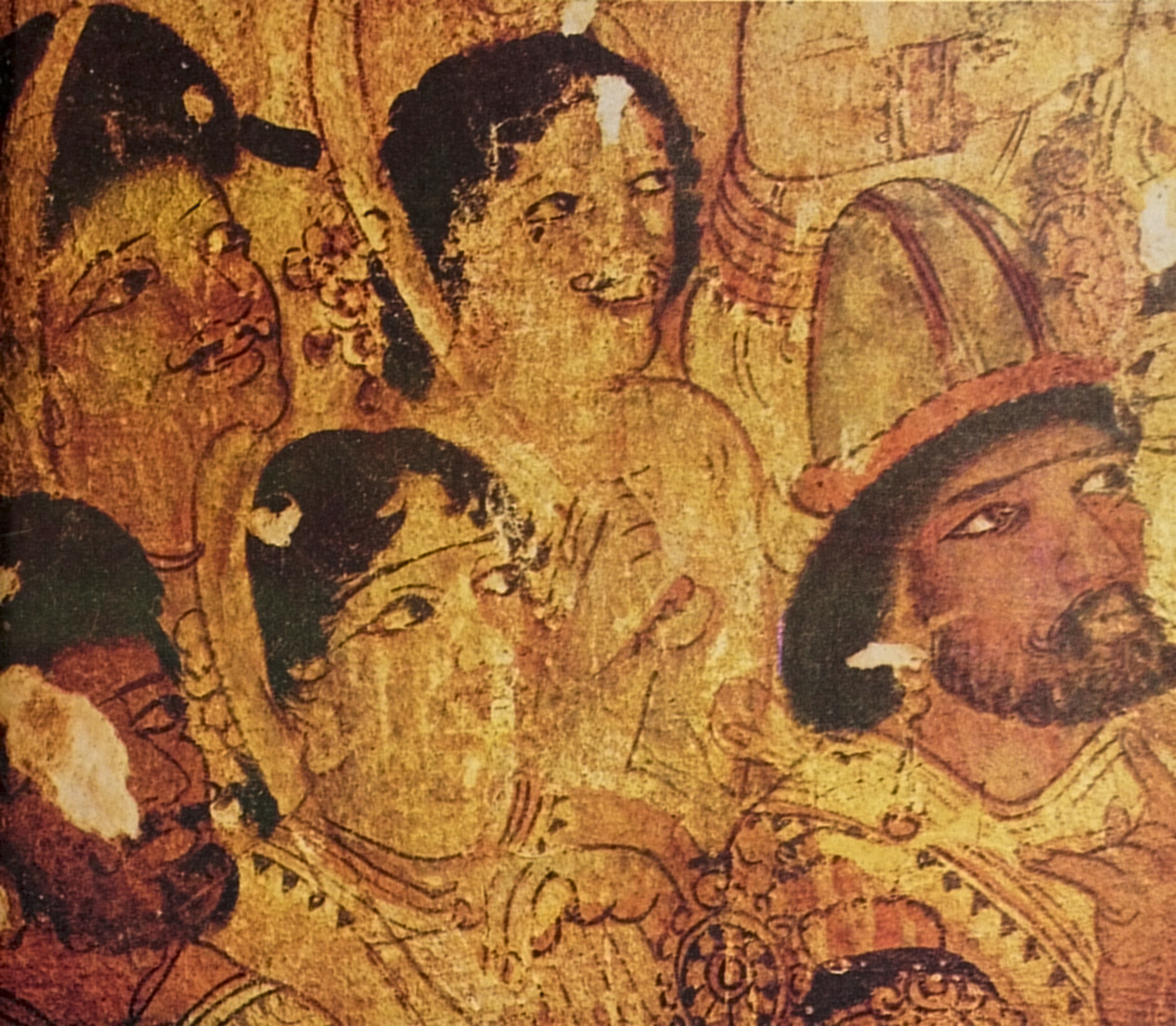
Foreigners in Cave 17, Ajanta

== Chronology ==
The chronology of Gupta art is quite critical to the art history of the region. Fortunately, several statues are precisely dated, based on inscriptions referring to the various rulers of the Gupta Empire, and giving their regnal dates in the Gupta era.

Dated statuary under the Guptas
(319–543 CE)
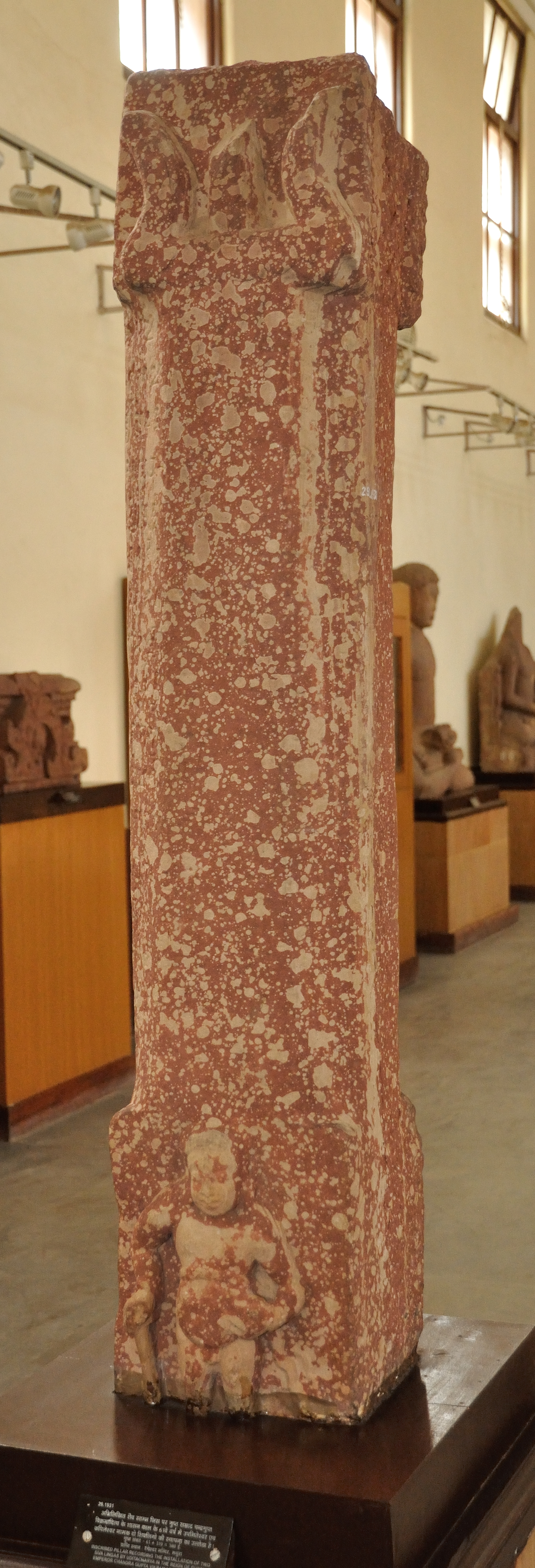
380 CE
Lakulisa Pillar in the "year 61 following the era of the Guptas (380 CE).

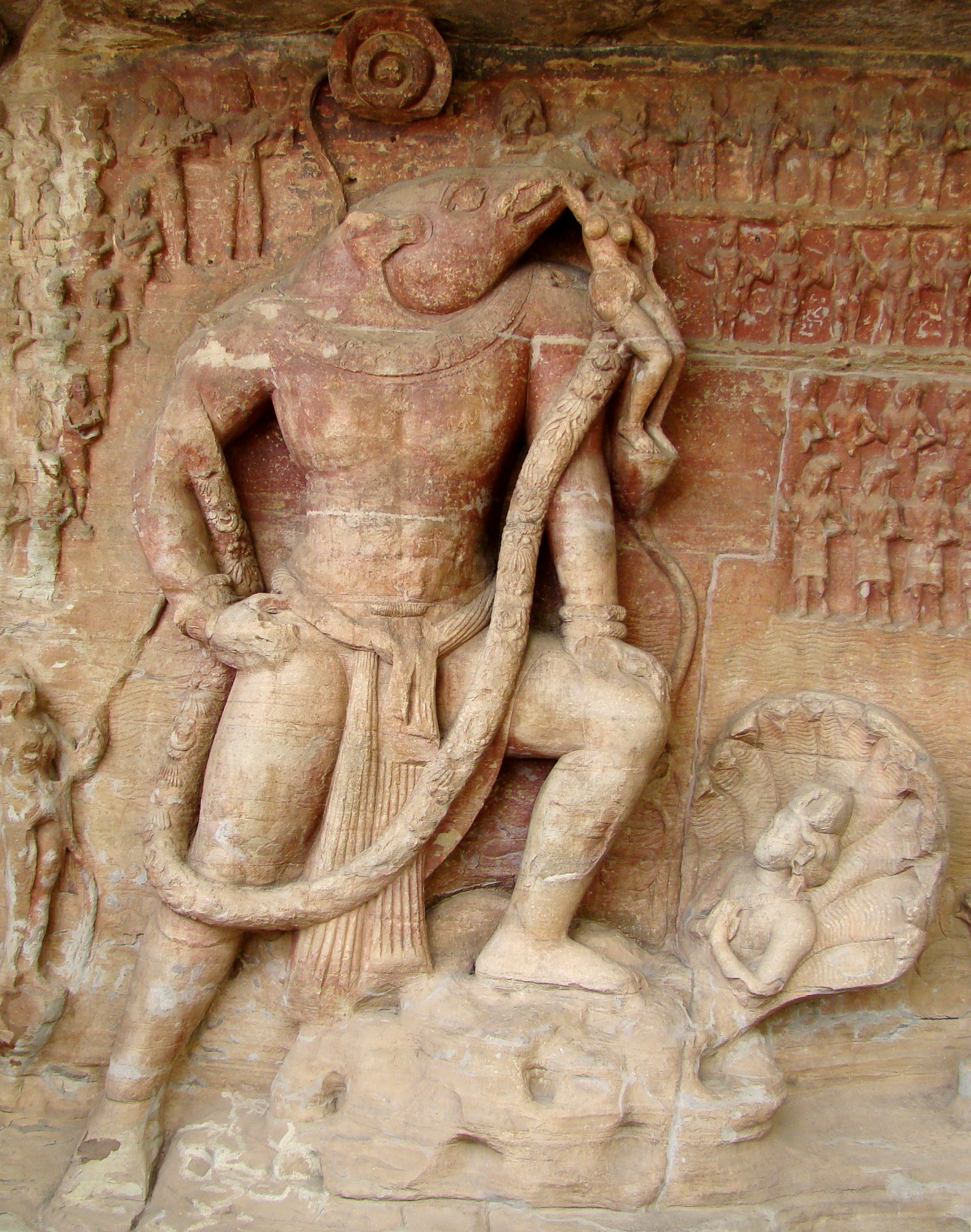
c. 400 CE
Vishnu in his Varaha or man-boar avatar rescuing goddess earth. Udayagiri Caves. Reign of Chandragupta II.

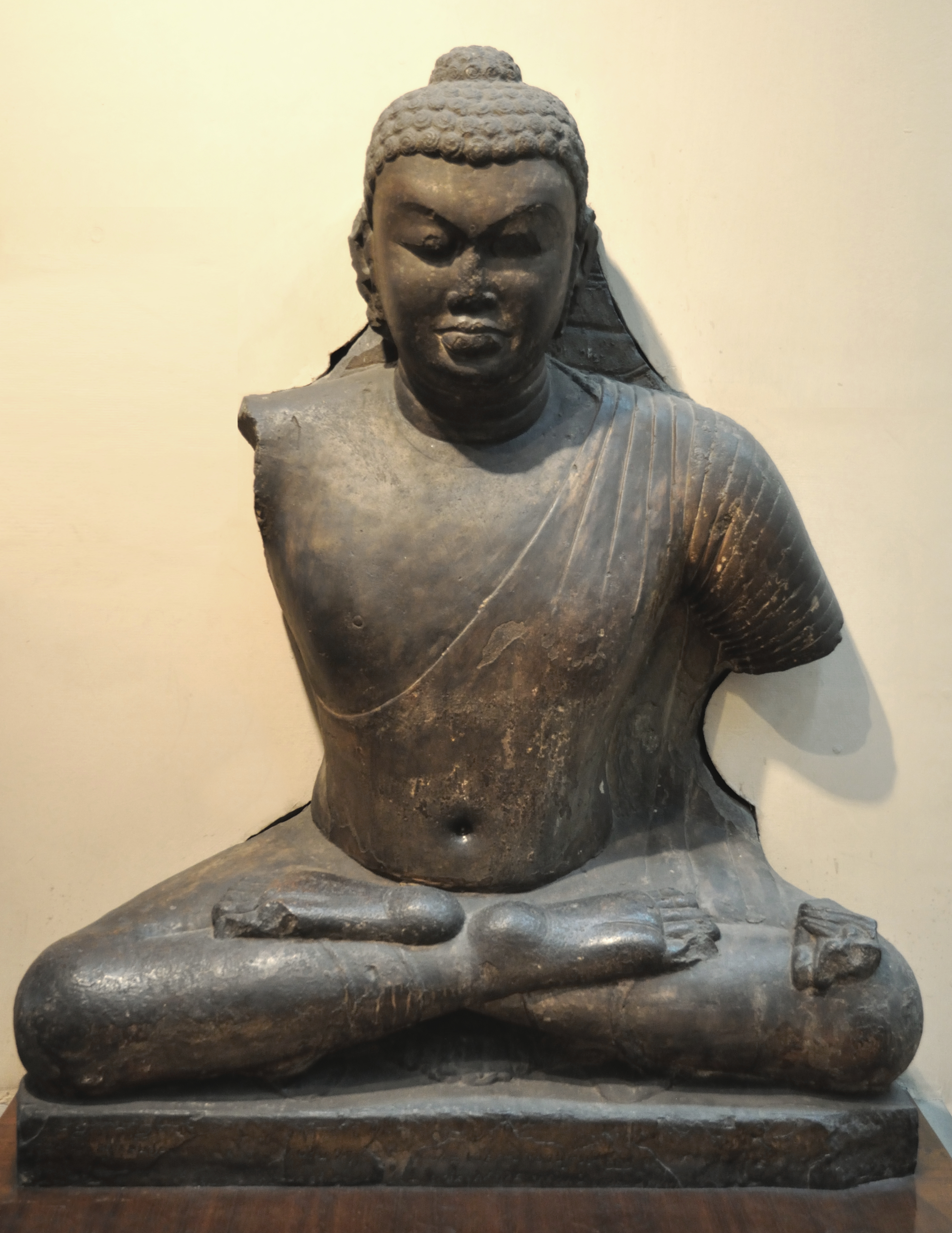
384 CE
One of the earliest dated Gupta statues, a Bodhisattva derived from the Kushan style of Mathura art, inscribed "year 64" of the Gupta era, 384 CE, Bodh Gaya. Reign of Chandragupta II.

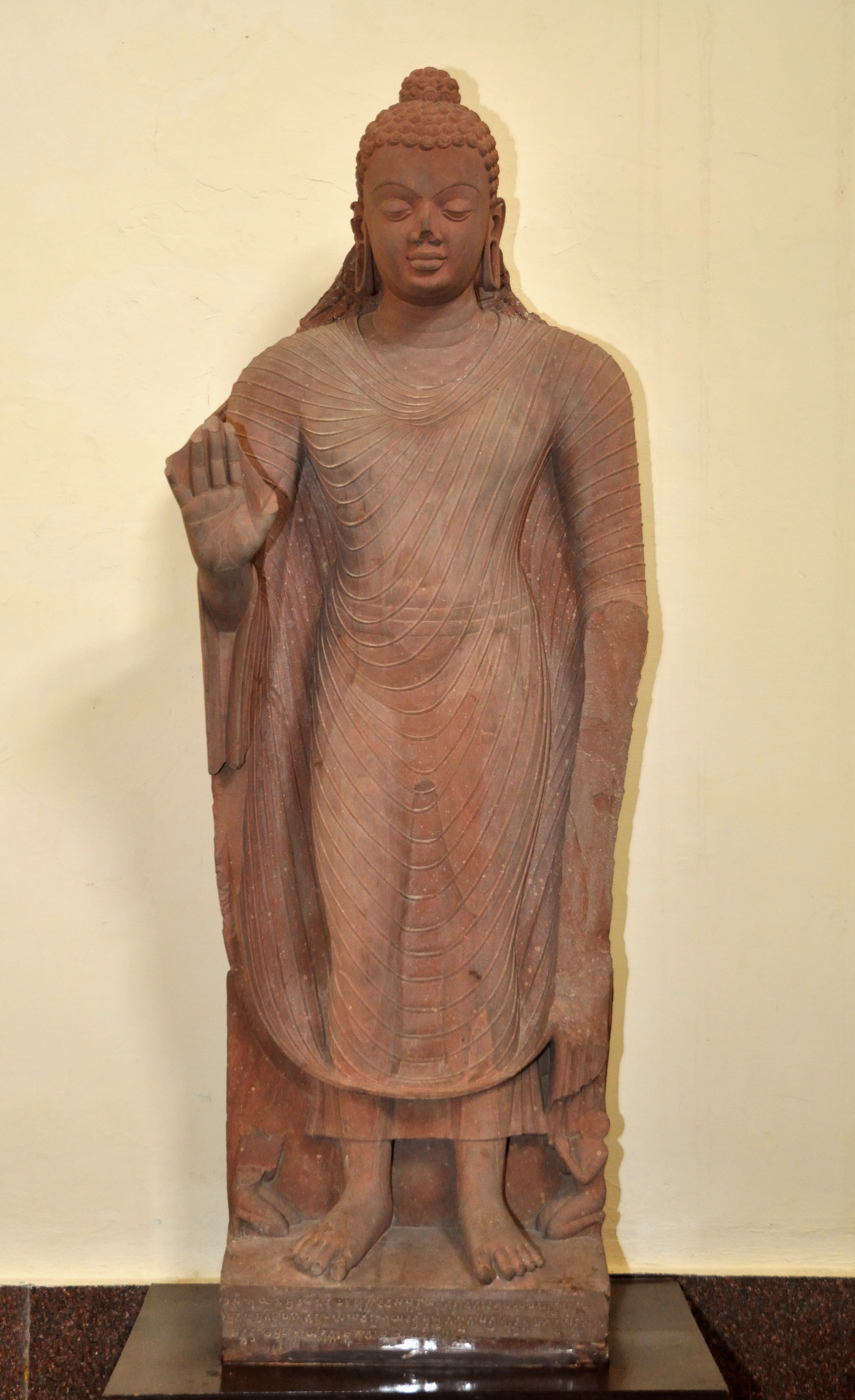
434 CE
Standing Buddha, inscribed Gupta Era year 115 (434 CE), Mathura. Reign of Kumaragupta I.

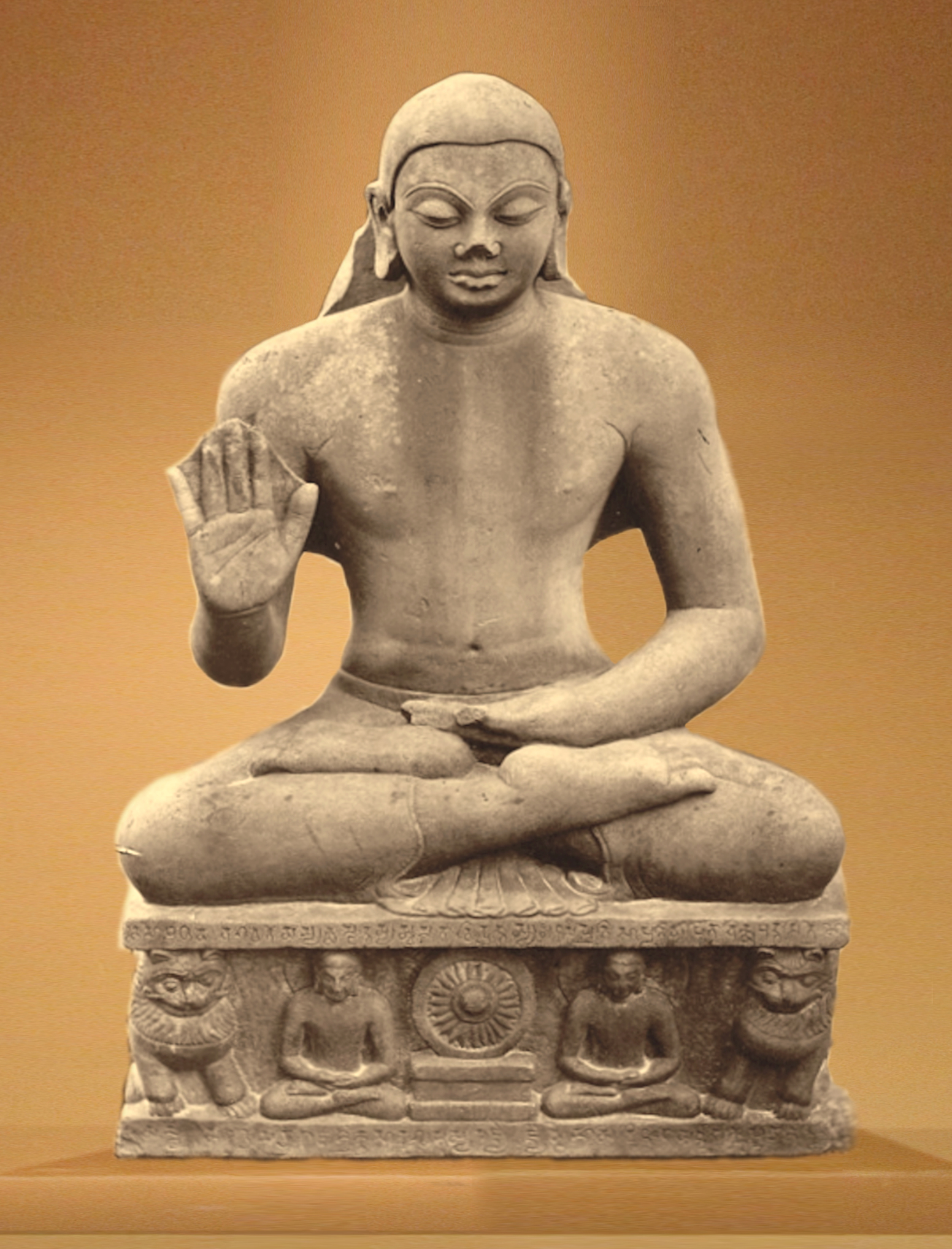
448 CE
The Mankuwar Buddha, with inscribed date "year 129 in the reign of Maharaja Kumaragupta", hence 448 CE. Mankuwar, District of Allahabad. Lucknow Museum.

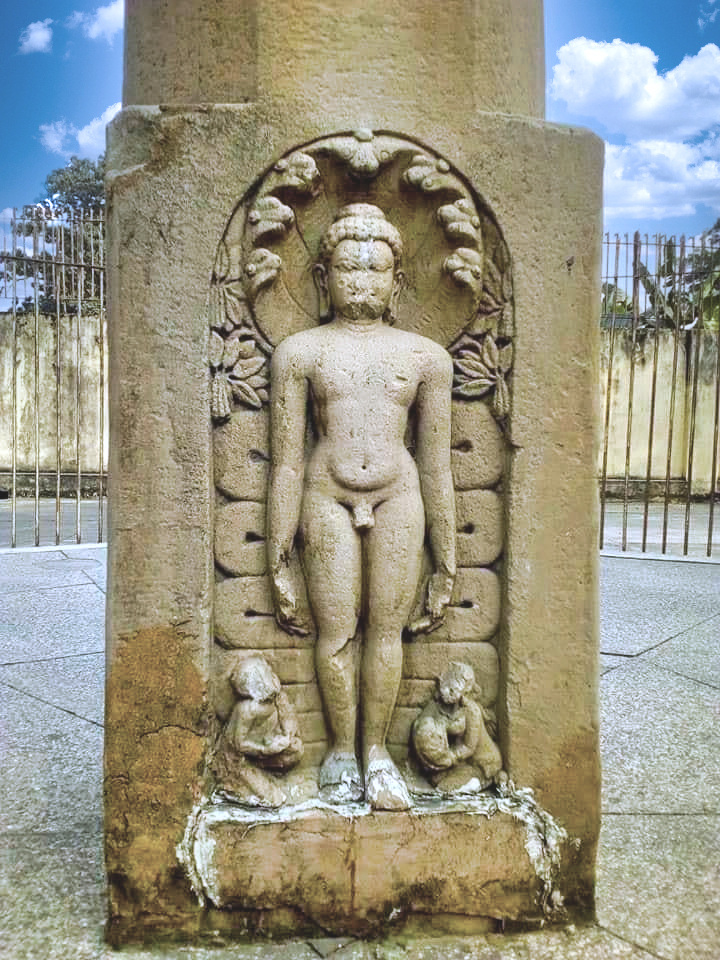
461 CE
Relief of Jain tirthankara Parshvanatha on the Kahaum pillar erected by a private individual during Skandagupta's reign in 461 CE

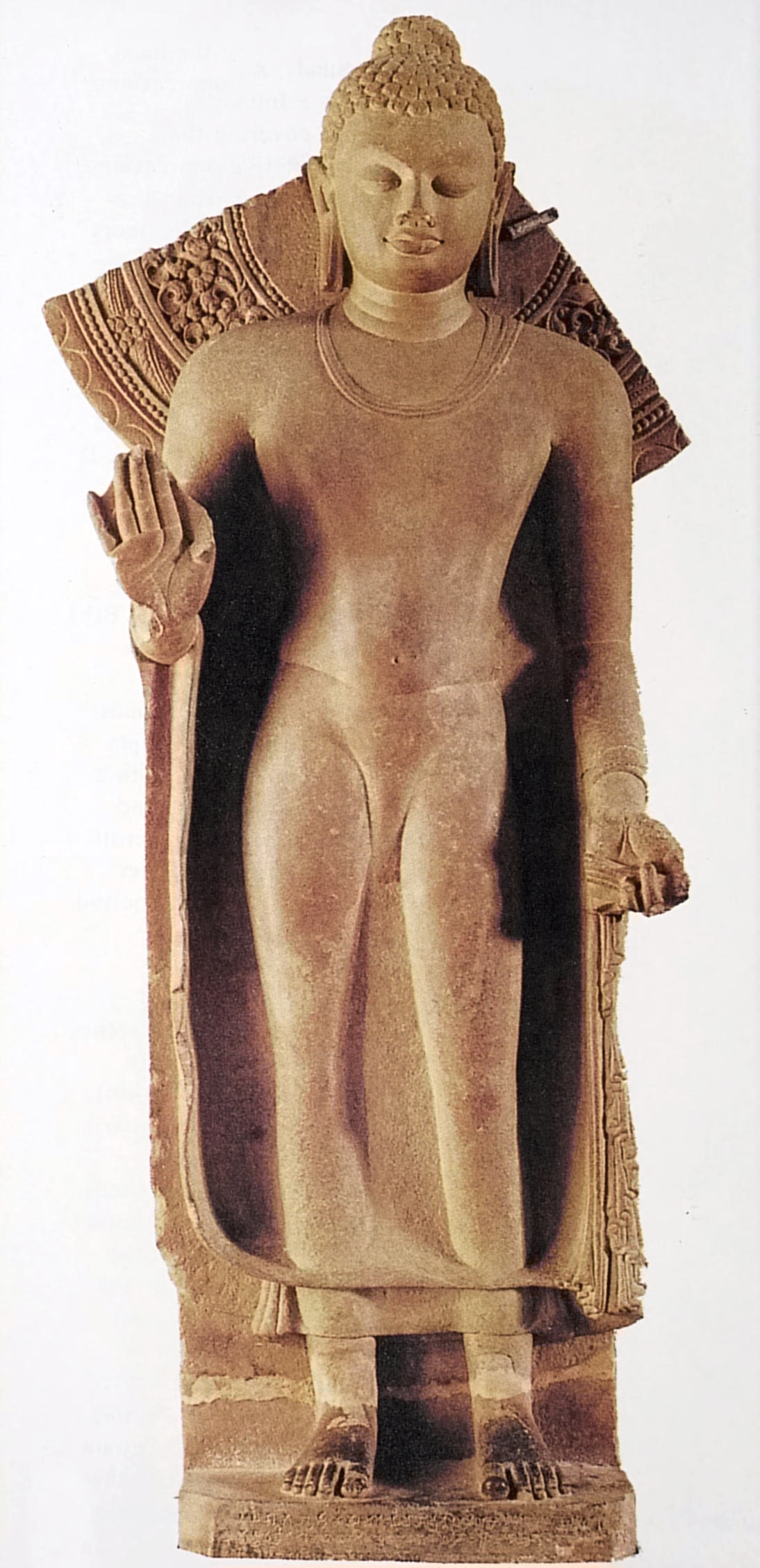
474 CE
"Gift of Abhayamira in 154 GE" (474 CE) in the reign of Kumaragupta II.

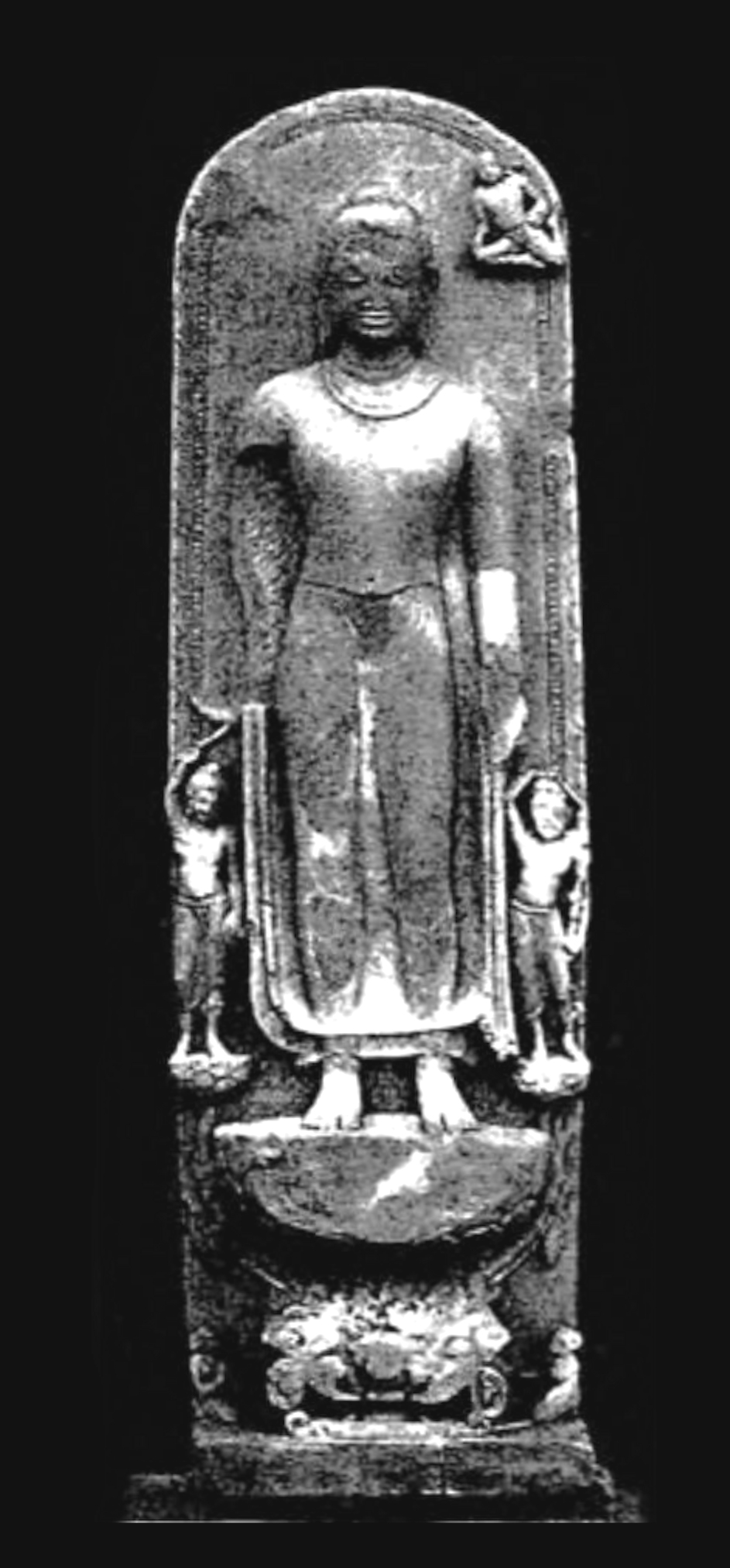
476 CE
"Gift of Abhayamitra in 157 in the reign of Buddhagupta" (476 CE).

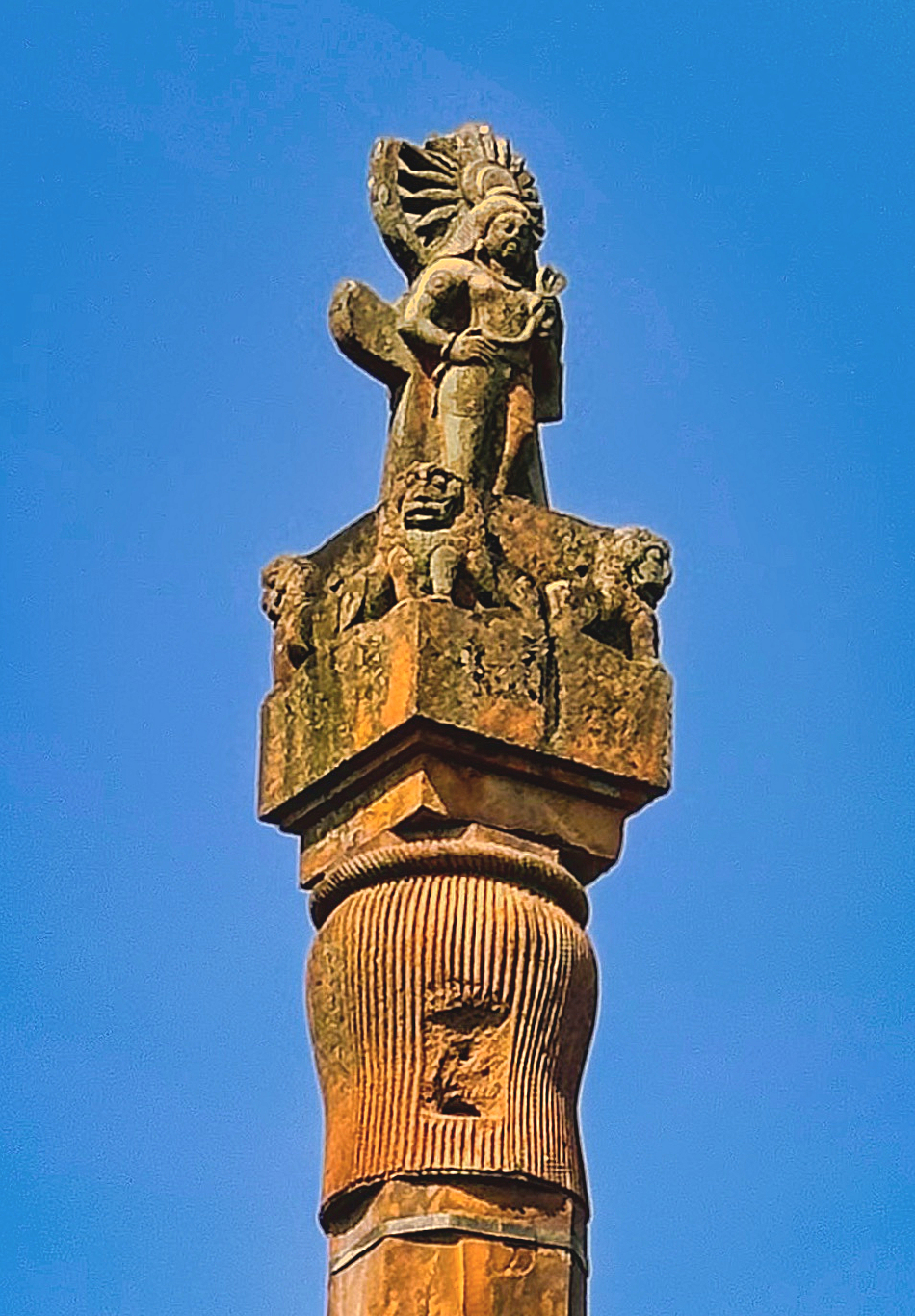
484 CE
Buddhagupta pillar at Eran, raised in honour of Janardana, another name of Vishnu, dated year 165. On top is a double statue of Garuda.

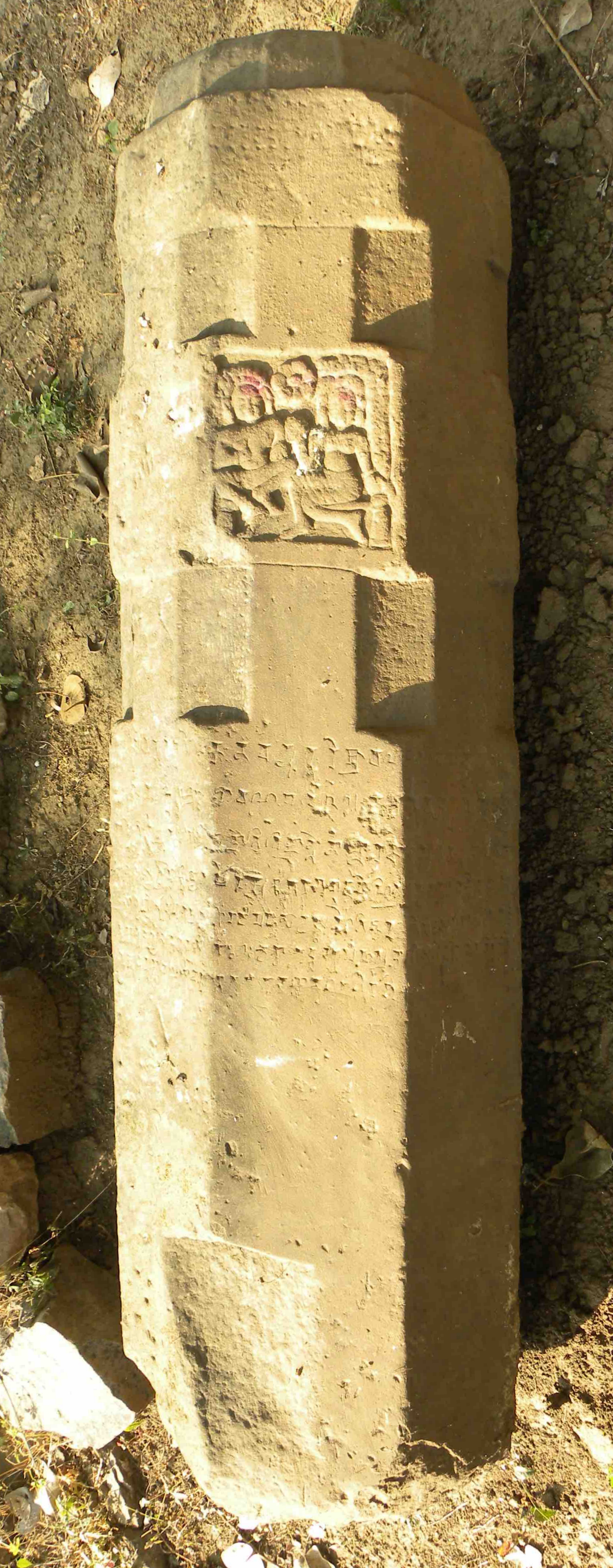
510 CE
Eran pillar of Bhanugupta.

=== Final period: Sondani (525 CE) ===
The sculptures at Sondani and surrounding areas of Mandsaur are a good marker for the final period of Gupta Art, as they were commissioned by Yasodharman (ruled 515 – 545 CE) around 525 CE, in celebration of his victory against the Alchon Hun king Mihirakula. This corresponds to the last phase of Gupta cultural and political unity in the subcontinent, and after that point and for the next centuries, Indian politics became extremely fragmented, with the territory being divided between smaller dynasties. The art of Sondani is considered as transitional between Gupta art and the art of Medieval India: it represents "an aesthetic which hovered between the classical decorum of Gupta art on the one hand and on the other the medieval canons which subordinated the figure to the larger religious purpose".

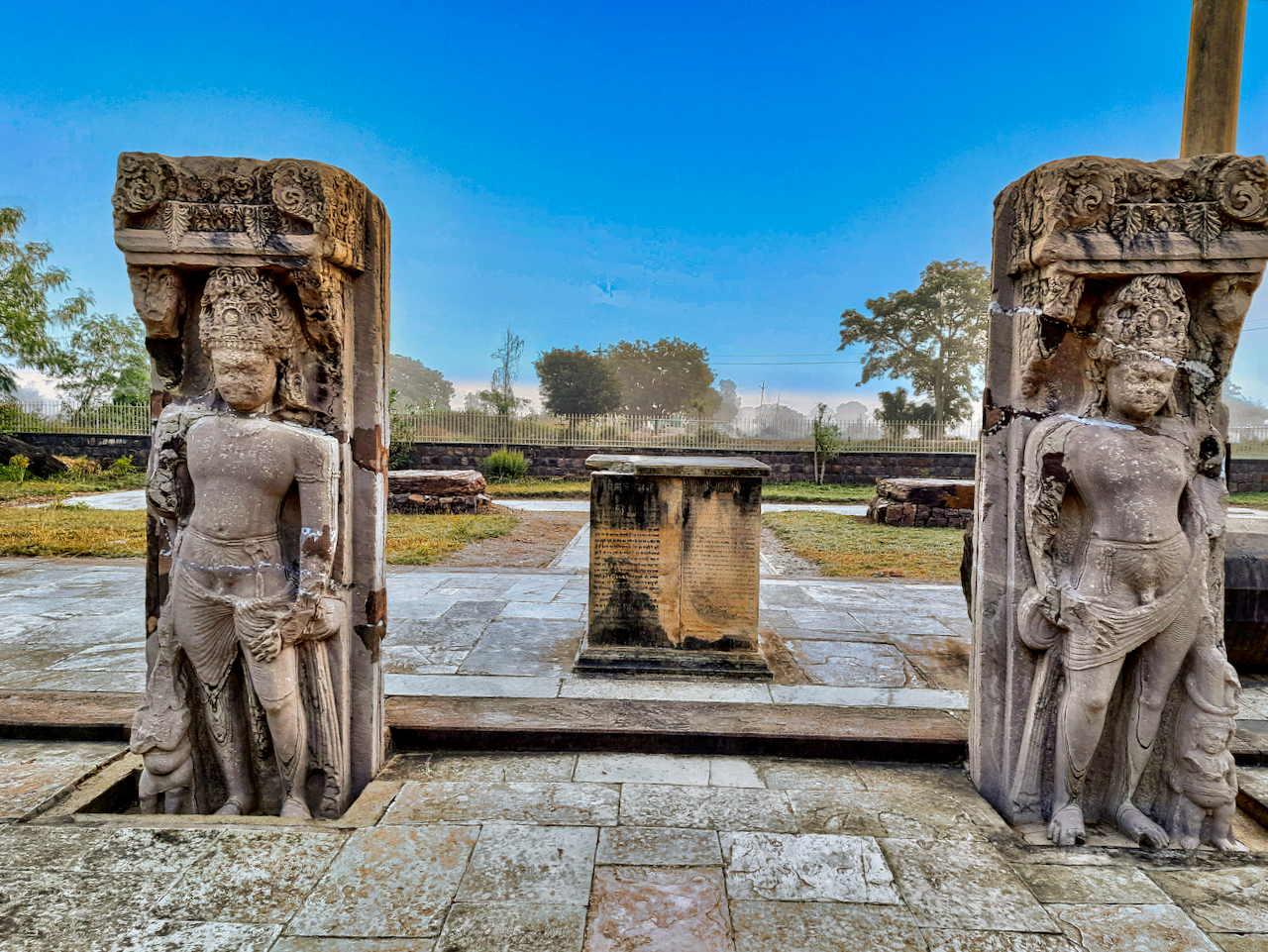
Sondani, two Dvarapalas, circa 525 CE

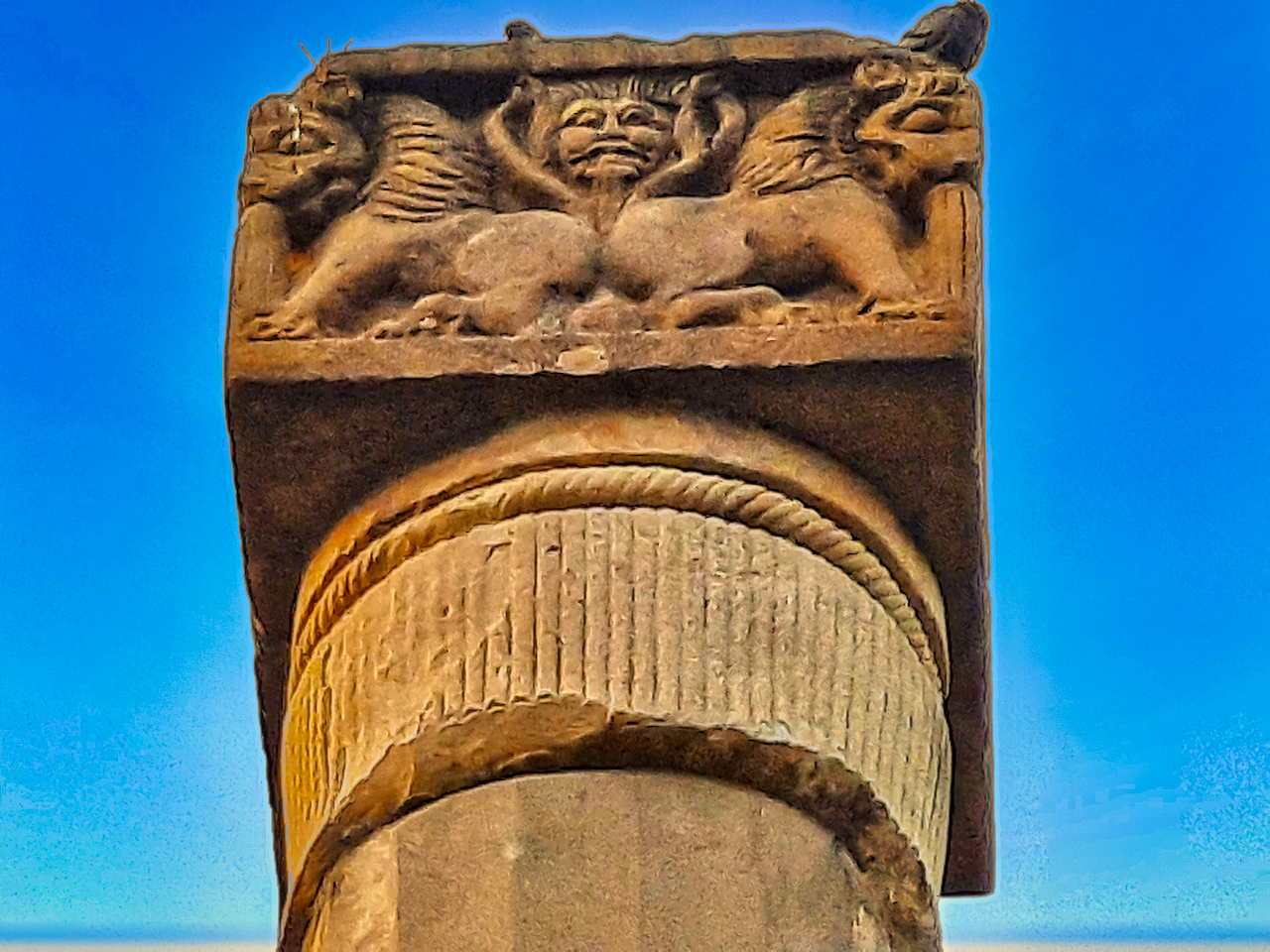
Sondani pillar capital, circa 525 CE

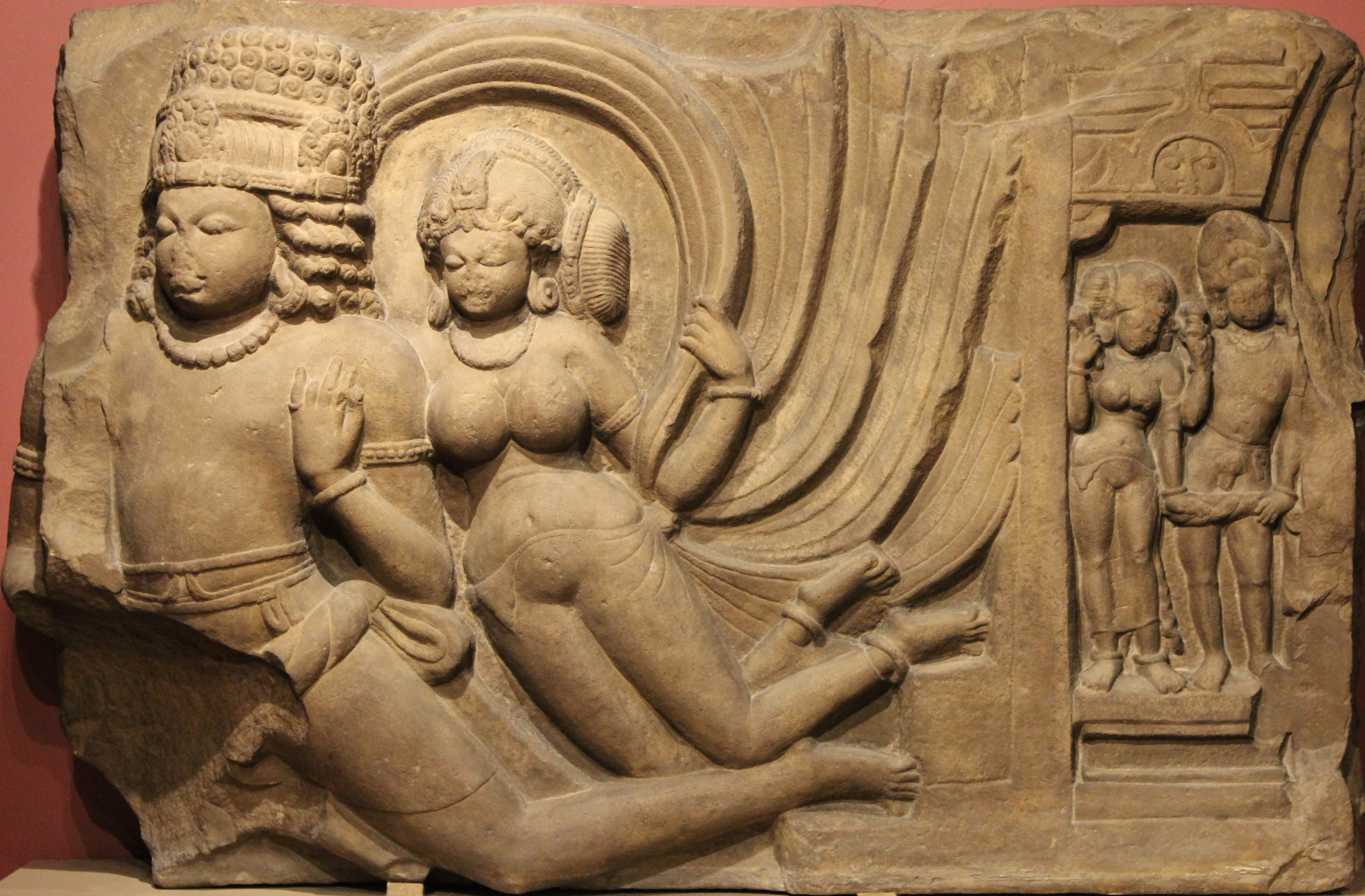
Vidyadhara, Sondani, circa 525 CE. National Museum, New Delhi

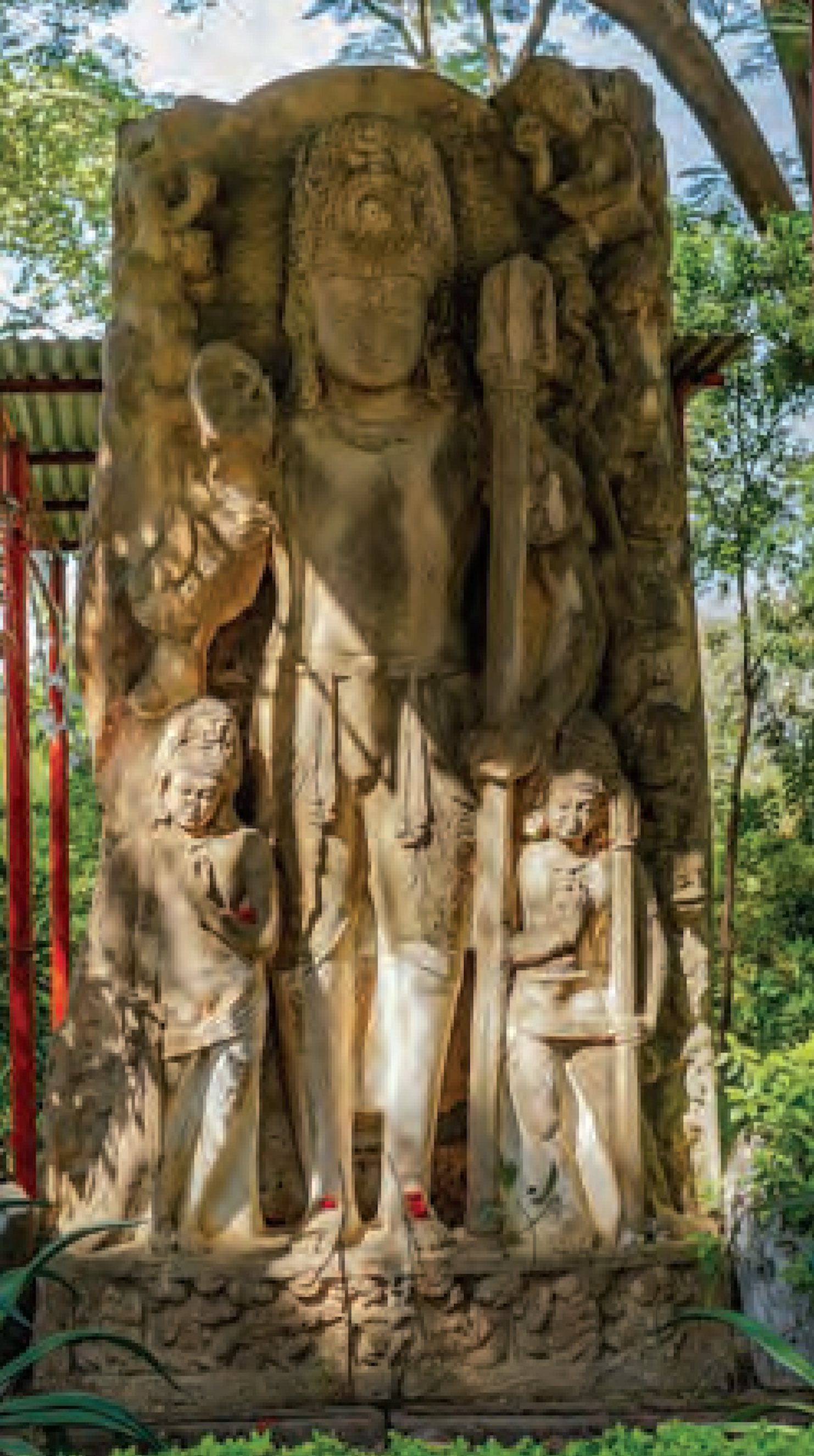
Prakasheshvara in Mandsaur Fort

== Influences in Southeast Asia ==
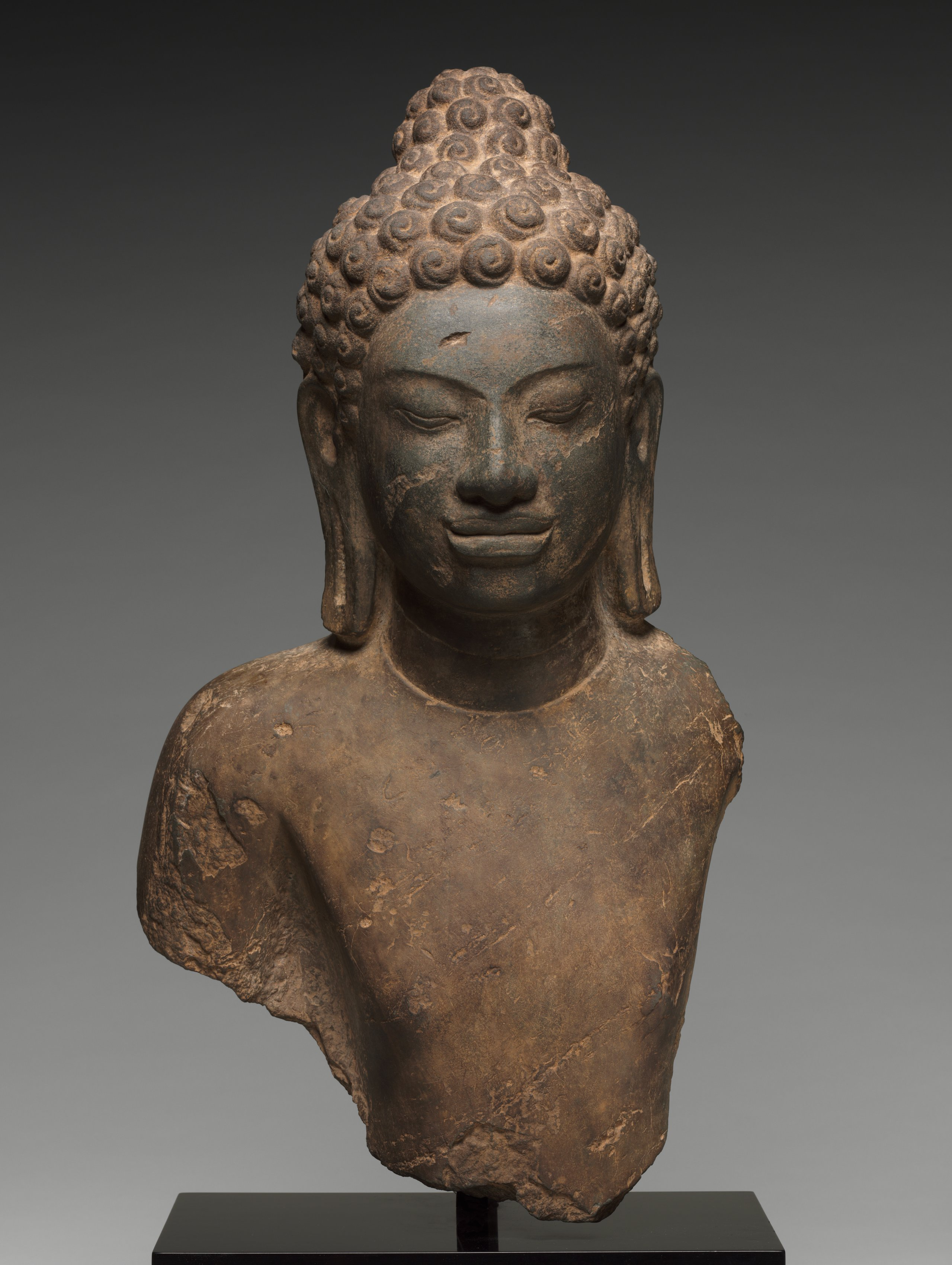
Central Thailand, Dvaravati, Mon-Dvaravati style, 7th–9th Century.

Indian art, particularly Gupta and Post-Gupta art from Eastern India, was influential in the development of Hindu and Buddhist art in Southeast Asia from the 6th century CE. The Mon people of the kingdom of Dvaravati in modern Thailand were among the first to adopt Buddhism, and developed a particular style of Buddhist art. Mon-Davarati statues of the Buddha have facial features and hair styles reminiscent of the art of Mathura. In pre-Angkorian Cambodia from the 7th century CE, Harihara statues fusing the characteristics of Shiva and Vishnu are known.

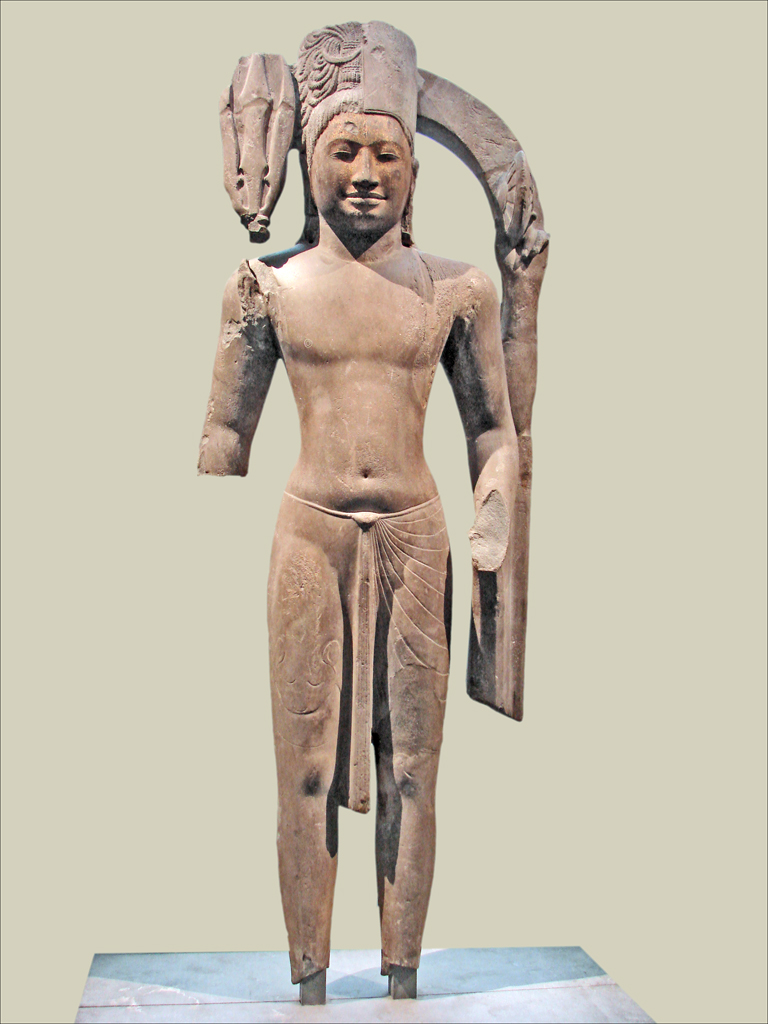
Harihara statue, Cambodia, 7th century CE

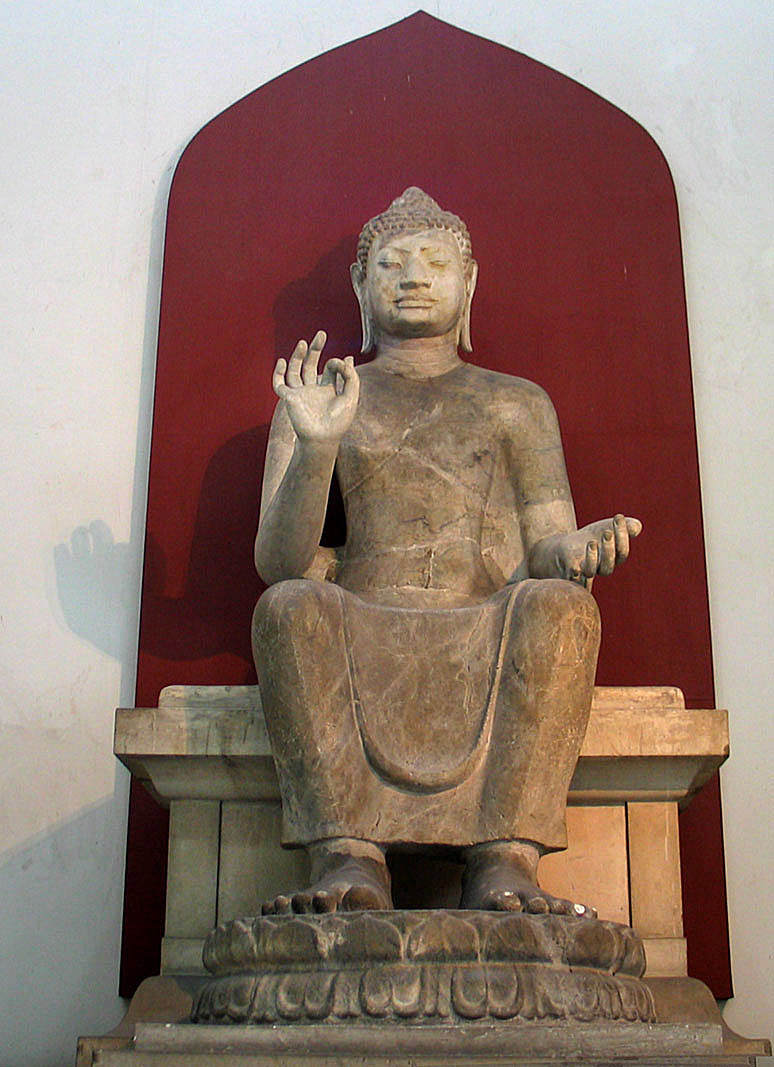
A seated Buddha in Dvaravati style, 6th century CE

== See also ==
- Indian art
- Architecture of India
- Indo-Greek art
- Art of Mathura
- Mauryan art
- Kushan art
- Hoysala architecture
- Vijayanagara architecture
- Greco-Buddhist art
- Chola art and architecture
- Pallava art and architecture
- Badami Chalukya architecture
