= Kahaum pillar =

One of the Pillars built during Gupta Era

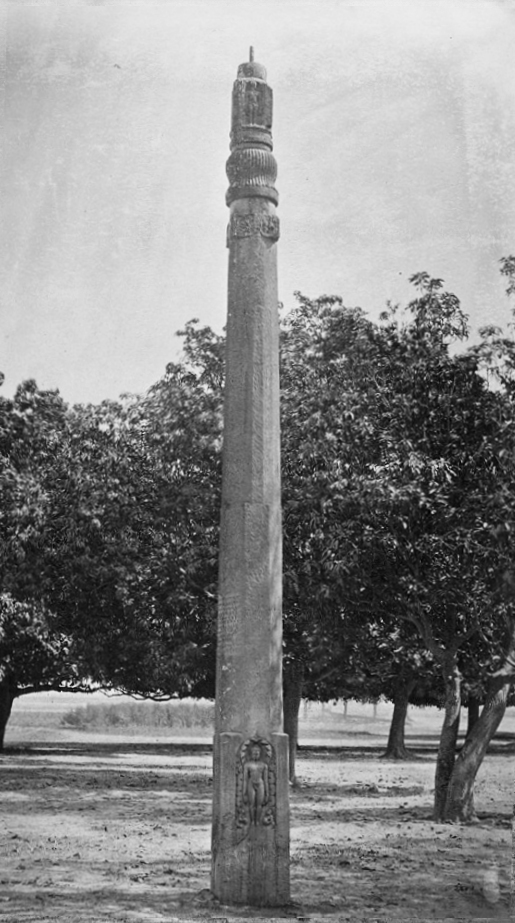
- The Kahaum pillar with carving of Parshvanatha and an inscription dating back to 461 CE during the reign of Skandagupta
- Material: sandstone
- Size: 8 metres (26 ft)
- Created: 5th century CE
- Period/culture: Gupta Empire
- Present location: Khukhundoo in Uttar Pradesh, India.

Location

Kahaum pillar is an 8 m (26 ft 3 in) structure located in Khukhundoo in the state of Uttar Pradesh. The pillar was erected in the 5th century during the reign of Skandagupta. The pillar has carvings of Parshvanatha and other tirthankaras with Brahmi script.

== Description ==
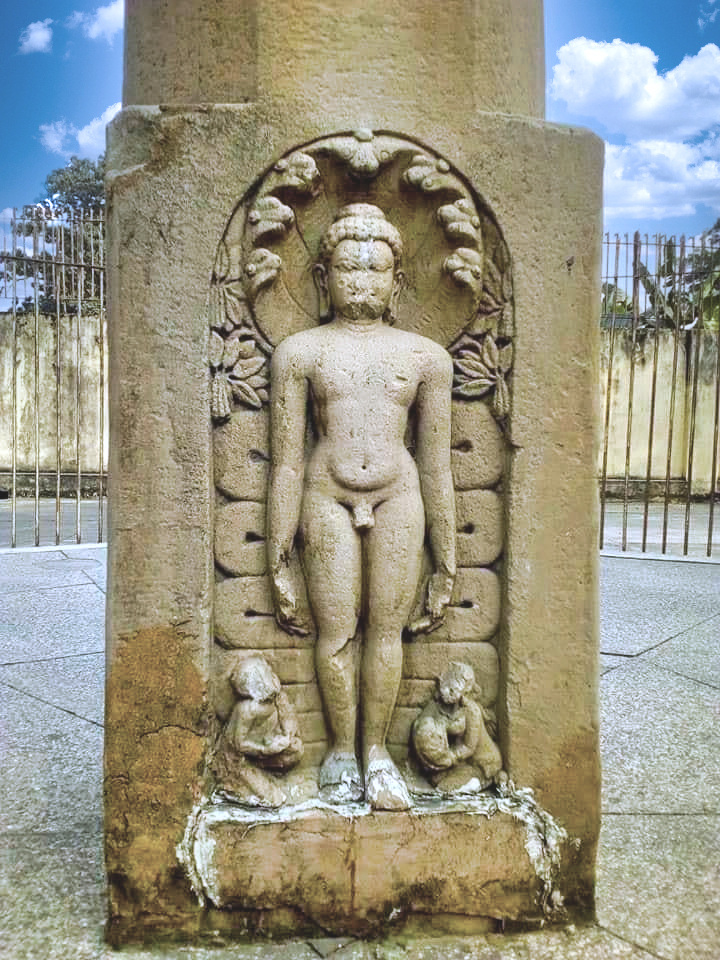
Carving of Parshvanatha at the plinth of the pillar

Kahaum pillar is a grey-sandstone that was erected during the reign of Skandagupta, Gupta Empire by a Jain ascetic named Madras. According to inscription of the pillar, the pillar was erected in the Jyeshtha month of year 141 of the Gupta era (A.D. 460–61).

There is a 0.673 by 0.51 metres (2 ft 2.5 in by 1 ft 8.1 in) on the pillar with writing with characters belonging to eastern variety of Gupta alphabet similar to that of Samudragupta inscription of Allahabad Pillar. The inscription is written in Sanskrit language, and written in verses except for the first word, siddhaṁ. The inscription defines reign of Skandagupta as peaceful and describes him as "commander of a hundred kings". The inscription also has an adoration to Arihant of Jainism.

== Jain sculptures ==
There are carving of five Jain Tirthankara in kayotsarga posture — one in a niche square face, two below the circular stone and two on the pinnacle of the column. These images are identified to be of Rishabhanatha, Shantinatha, Neminatha, Parshvanatha and Mahavira. (Note: Rishabhanatha, Shantinatha, Neminatha, Parshvanatha and Mahavira attract the most devotional worship among the Jains.)

The most prominent surviving image is carved on the lower part of the pillar. It represents a nude standing Jina sheltered by a seven-hooded serpent canopy and is therefore identifiable as Parshvanatha. Two kneeling worshippers, a man and a woman, flank the figure. The capital consists of a lotus-bell supporting a square section with a nude standing Jina carved on each of its four faces. These figures have been identified as Rishabhanatha, Shantinatha, Neminatha and Mahavira.

According to inscription, these images were carved by Madra who is described as devotee of dvija, guru and yati.

== Inscription ==
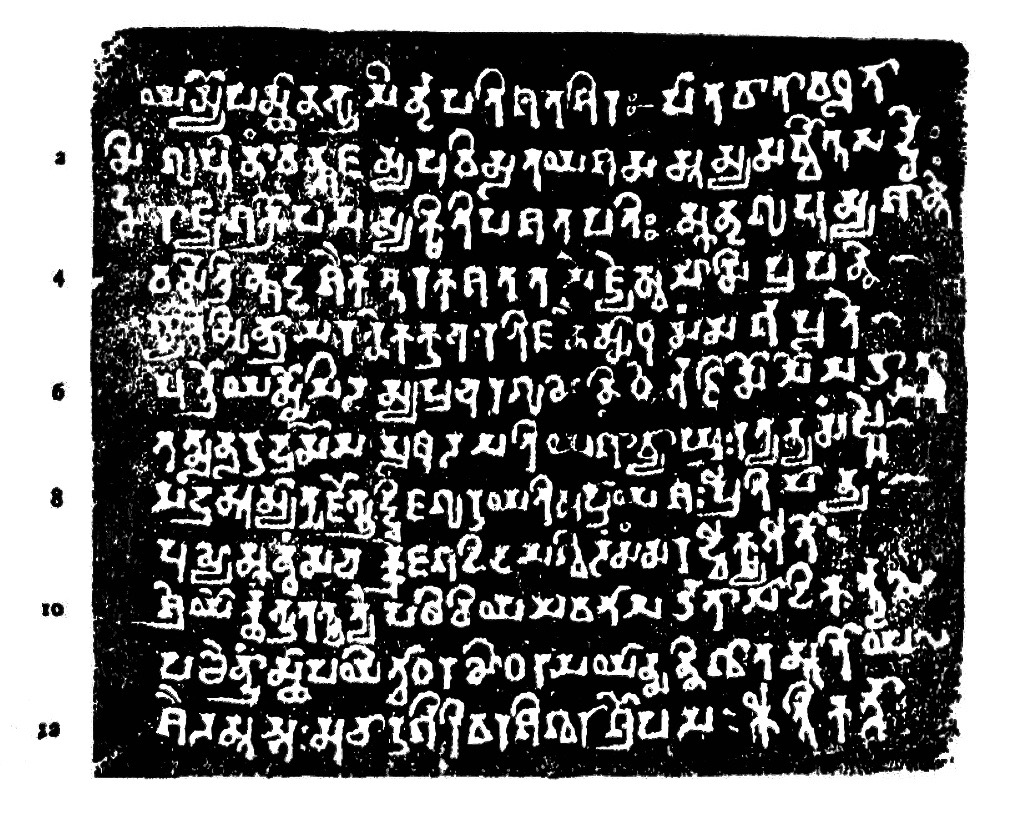
inscription on the Kahaum pillar

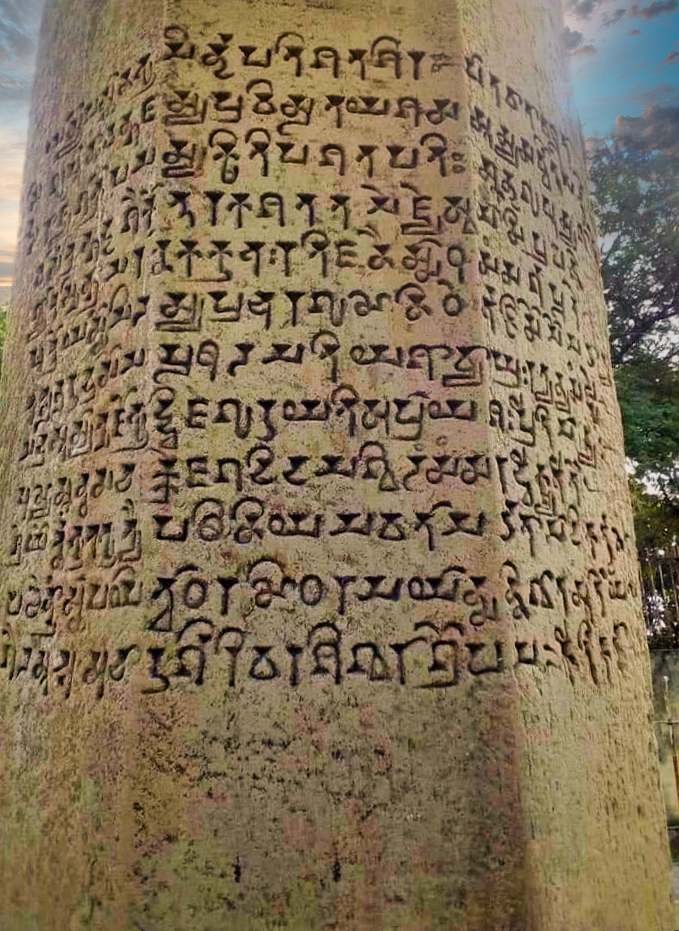
inscription on the Kahaum pillar

Genealogy

[Verse 1] (L.1.) — Perfection has been attained! In the tranquil reign of Skandagupta, whose hall of audience is shaken by the wind caused by the falling down (in the act of performing obeisance) of the heads of a hundred kings; who is bom in the lineage of the Gupta; whose fame is spread far and wide; who excels all others in prosperity; who resembles (the god) Sakra : (and) who is the lord of a hundred kings - in the one hundredth year, increased by thirty and ten and one; the month Jyeshtha having arrived.

Madra Kingdom

[Verse 2] (L.5.) — In this jewel of a village, which is known by people under the name of Kakubha (and) which is pure from association with holy men, (there was) the high-minded Bhattisoma, who (was) the son of Sdmila, that receptacle of many good qualities. His son (was) Rudrasoma, of great intellect and fame, who had the other appellation of Vyaghra. His son was Madra, who (was) especially full of affection for Brahmans and religious preceptors and ascetics.

Adoration to Jain Tirthankaras

[Verse 3] (L.9.) — He, being alarmed when he observed the whole of this world (to be ever) passing through a succession of changes, acquired for himself a large mass of religious merit. (And by him ), — having set up, for the sake of final beatitude (and) for the welfare of (all) existing beings five excellent (images), made of stone, (of) those who led the way in the path of the Arhats who practise religious observances, there was then planted in the ground this most beautiful pillar of stone, which resembles the tip of the summit of the best of mountains, (and) which confers fame (upon him).

— Madra inscription on the Kahaum pillar.

== Significance ==
The Kahaum inscription is significant for both Gupta and Jain history. Its precise date makes the monument one of the securely dated examples of Jain sculpture and epigraphy from 5th-century northern India. Unlike royal religious foundations, the inscription records patronage by a private individual, Madra, while simultaneously dating the monument through its reference to the reign of Skandagupta. It therefore provides evidence for Jain patronage outside the imperial court during the Gupta period. The monument also preserves the ancient place-name Kakubha, which has been identified with modern Kahaum (also spelled Kahaon or Kahanv).

== See also ==
- Gupta art
- Pataini temple
- Bhitari pillar inscription of Skandagupta
