= Mahendraditya =

Mahendraditya may refer to:

- A legendary king of Ujjain, who was father of Vikramaditya
- Kumaragupta I (r. c. 415-455 CE), an emperor who adopted the title Mahendraditya
