= Tumain inscription of Kumāragupta =

Tumen inscription of Kumāragupta
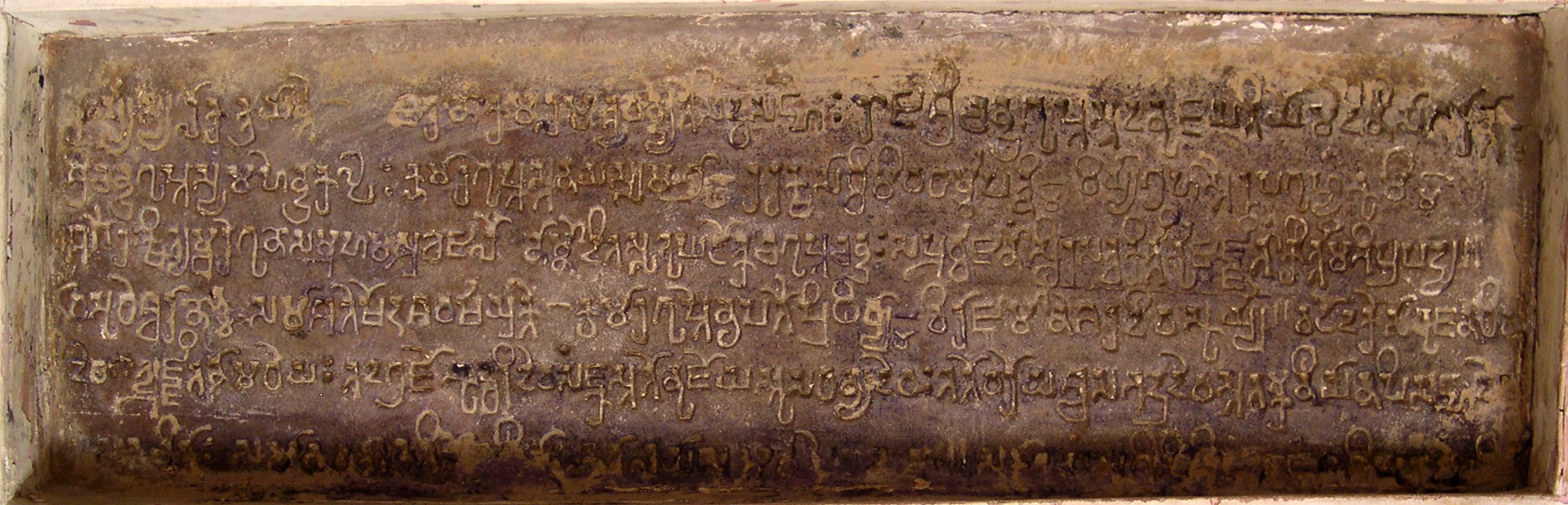
- Tumain inscription of Kumāragupta I. Archaeological Museum, Gwalior.
- Material: Stone
- Created: 5th century CE
- Discovered: 24.34°N 77.43°E
- Present location: Gwalior Archaeological Museum

The Tumen inscription of Kumāragupta is an epigraphic record documenting the construction of a temple in the time of the Gupta king Kumaragupta I. It is dated year 116 in the Gupta era (circa 436 CE).

== Location ==
Tumen (तूमैन, Tumen), also Tumen or Tumbavana (तुंबवन), is a village in Ashoknagar District, Madhya Pradesh, India. The inscription is currently located in the Archaeological Museum, Gwalior.

== Publication ==
The inscription was first published by M. B. Garde in 1918-19. It was subsequently listed by Bhandarkar and M. Willis. An edition with translation was published in Epigraphia Indica in 1941-42. A second edition appeared in the revised edition of Corpus Inscriptionum Indicarum, volume 3, published in 1981.

== Description and Contents ==
The inscription is in the Sanskrit language, engraved in six lines. The prime historical importance of the inscription is its mention of Ghaṭotkacagupta.

== Metrics ==
The metrics are not recorded in the publications consulted.

== Text ==
1) [ri]ryyasya lokattrayānte | caraṇakamalaṃ(la)mattyaṃ(cchaṃ) vandye(ndya)te siddhasaṅdaiḥ(ṅdhaiḥ) [||*] rājā śrī-Candraguptas-tad-anujayate yo medinīṃ sāgarāntām

2) - śrī-Candraguptasya mahendrakalpaḥ kumāraguptas-tanayas-sa[magrām] [|*] rarakṣa sādhvīm iva dharmmapatnīm vairyyāgrahastairupa guhyam bhūmim [||*]

3) [ - - ] gauraḥ kṣityambare guṇasamūhamayūkhajālo nāmnoditassa tu ghaṭotkacaguptacandraḥ [||*] sa pūrvvajānāṃ sthira-satva-kīrttir-bhujārjjitāṃ kīrttim=abhiprapadya ||(|)

4) [guptānvayā*]nāṃ vasudheśvarāṇā[m] samāśate ṣoḍaśavarṣayukte | kumāragupte nṛpatau pri(pṛ)thivyām virājā(ja)māne śaradīva sūryye || vaṭodake sādhujanādhivāse

5) taśśrīdeva ityūrjjitanāmadheyaḥ [||*] tadagrajobhūddharidevasaṃjгastatoёanujo yastu sa dhanyadevaḥ [|*] tatovaro yaśca sa bhadradevastata[‘]kanīyānapi saṅha(ṅgha)deva[ḥ ||*]

6) - nasaktacittāḥ samāna[vṛ]ttākṛti[bhāvadhīrāḥ kṛtā]layā[stu]mbavane ba[bhū]vuḥ || akārayaṃste giri[śri](śṛ)ṅgatuṅgaṃ śaśi[prabhaṃ] devani[ketanaṃ-|]

== Translation ==
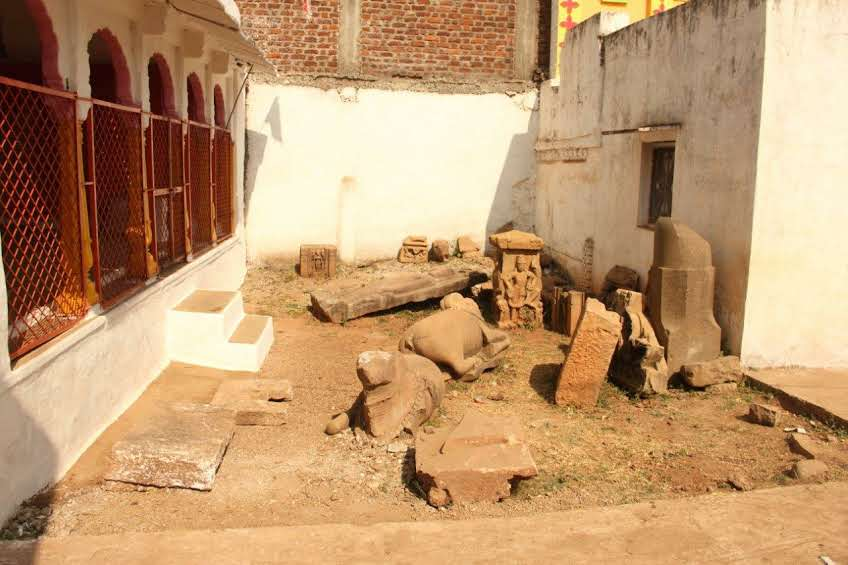
Old artifacts in Tumain.

(Line 1) ... .whose lotus-like feet, which are the source of knowledge, are adored by bands of Siddhas up to the extremities of the three worlds. Thereafter, pre-eminent is the illustrious Chandragupta, the king, who...... the earth up to the ocean bounds ......

(Line 2) .......The son of the illustrious Chandragupta is Kumaragupta who is well-nigh the great Indra- and who protected the whole earth, holding her with arms, namely, valor, as if she were (his) chaste lawful wife.

(Line 3) ........brilliant; in the sky, namely, the earth, arose that moon, namely Ghatotkachagupta by name with (his) cluster of rays, namely, (his) store of good qualities. He of steady fame for the inherent prowess of (his) ancestors, having attained to fame acquired through (his) arms

(Line 4) when a century of years of sovereigns (born of Gupta) (had elapsed), accompanied by sixteen years (and) when Kumaragupta was the king shining on earth like the sun in the autumn; In Vatodaka, a settlement of merchants (sadhu),

(Line 5) ... .of the dignified name of Srideva; he had an elder brother called Harideva; but his younger was Dhanyadeva; younger than he was Bhadradeva; still younger than he was Sahghadeva.

(Line 6) .....(who) of unattached minds, of identical virtuous conduct (but) varying with difference of (human) figure, became the abodes of Kshatriya valour in Tumbavana; (and) who constructed (a shrine of) the god (Pinakin), as lofty as the peak of a hill and bearing the lustre of the moon.

— Tumain inscription of Kumaragupta.

== See also ==
- Indian inscriptions
