= Khukhundoo =

- Town
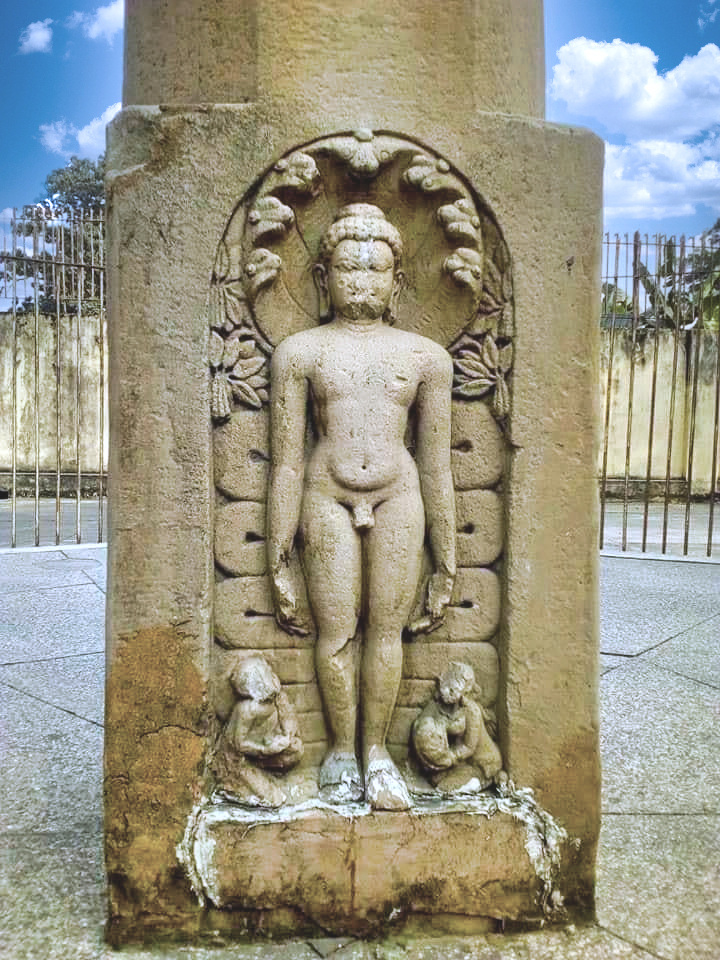
- Jain Tirthankara on Kahaum pillar
- Interactive map of Khukhundoo
- Coordinates: 26.394673°N 83.837914°E
- Country: India
- State: Uttar Pradesh
- District: Deoria district
- Time zone: UTC+5:30

Khukhundoo (old name is Kakandi Nagari), is a small town in the state of Uttar Pradesh in northern India, approximately 15 kilometres (9.3 mi) east of Deoria city near the border with Bihar state on Deoria Salempur road in Deoria district.

== Kakandi Jain Circuit ==
Kalyanak Kshetra - Kakandi (present name village - Khukhundoo) here became the austerity and knowledge of Tirthankara Pushpadant. Khukhundoo also well known as Tirthankara Pushpadanta birthplace as a son of King Sugriva and Queen Rama at Kakandi (Khukhundoo) situated on the Jain Circuit. There was a group of temples here. All turned into ruins with only one temple left.

A Jain Temple was built here by Rai Bahadur Mulchand in 1874. The main vedi housed idols of Neminath, Pushpadanta and Parshvanath.

== Kahaum pillar of Skandagupta ==
In 5th century an 8 metres (26 ft) pillar known as Kahaum pillar was erected during the reign of Skandagupta by a person named Madra.This pillar has carvings of Parshvanatha and other tirthankars with Brahmi script.

== Notable things ==
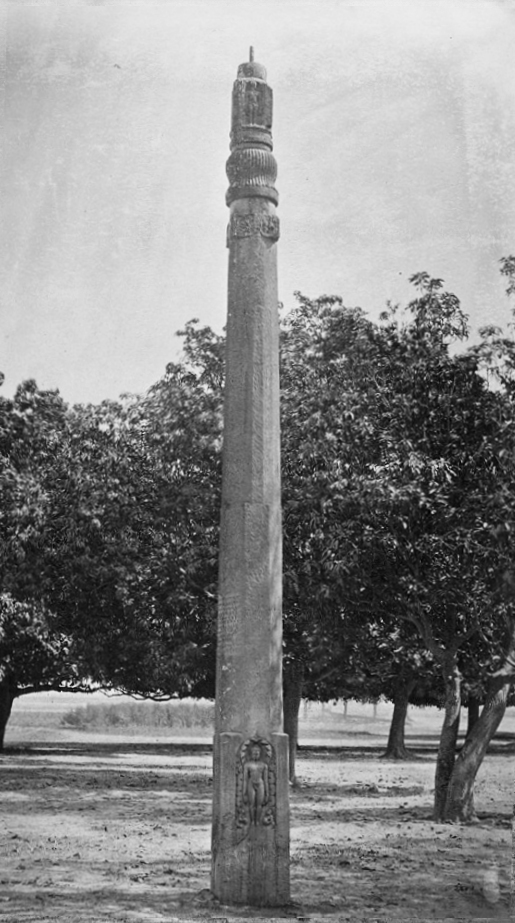
The Kahaum pillar (19th century photograph)

There is ancient temple of god Shiva at Khukhundoo. Khukhundoo is a Block (sub-division) in Deoria district of Uttar Pradesh.

There are two intermediate schools, one post graduate college and one primary health center in the town. Railway broad gauge trains of Indian Railways are running between Deoria and Bhatni passes through Nunkhar is 6 kilometer far from Khukhundoo.Former Union Cabinet Minister of India Sri Vishwanath Rai started his political career from Khukhundoo. From ancient time Khukhundoo is a center of study.

Other, nearest market place to this town is Deoria, Bhatni, Salempur, Nunkhar and Barhaj, in range of 20 km (12 mi).
