= Bhitari pillar inscription of Skandagupta =

Sanskrit inscription in India

Coordinates: 25.566654°N 83.288943°E

Bhitari pillar inscription of Skandagupta
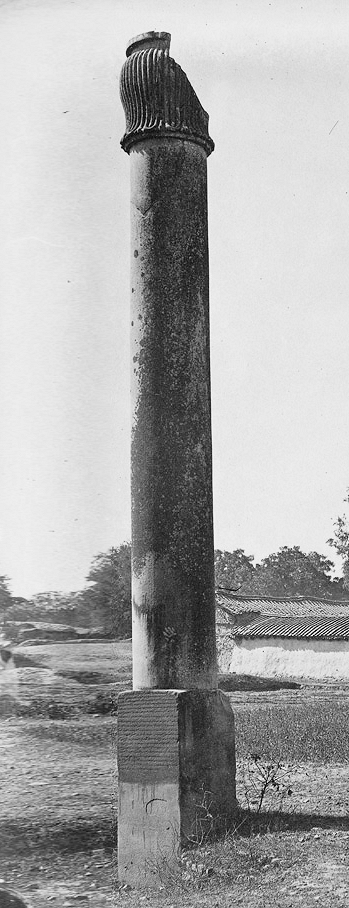
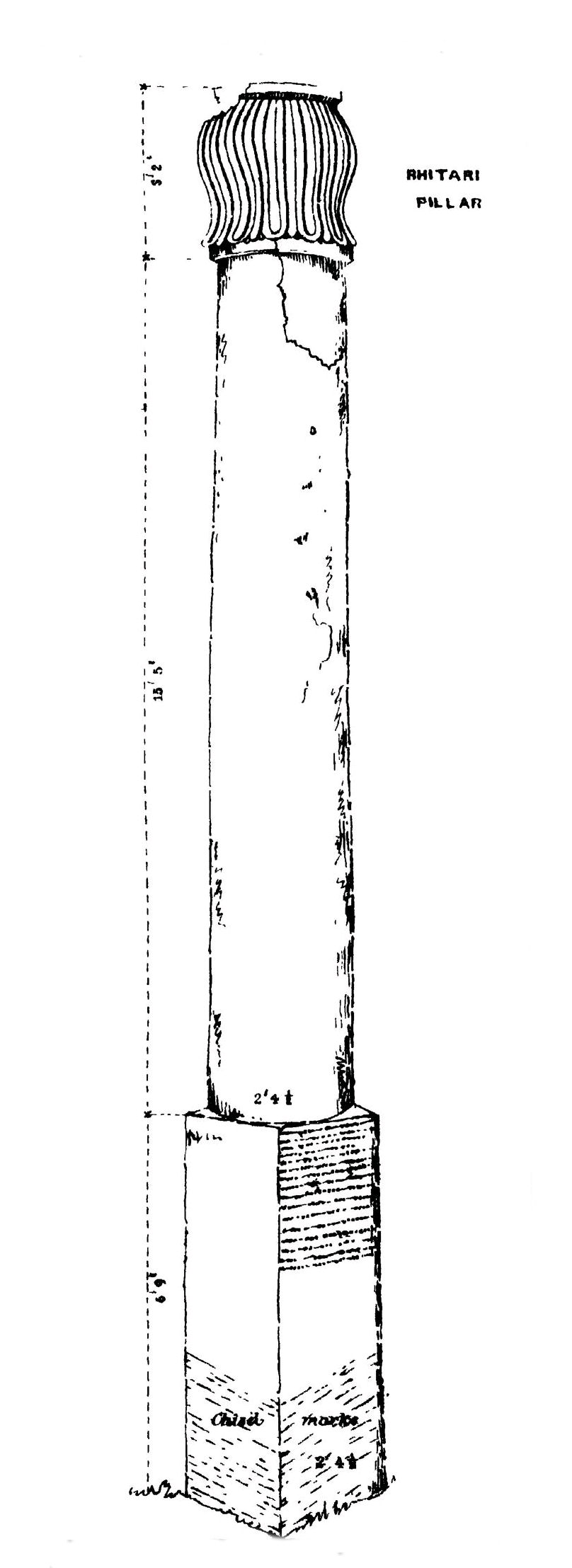
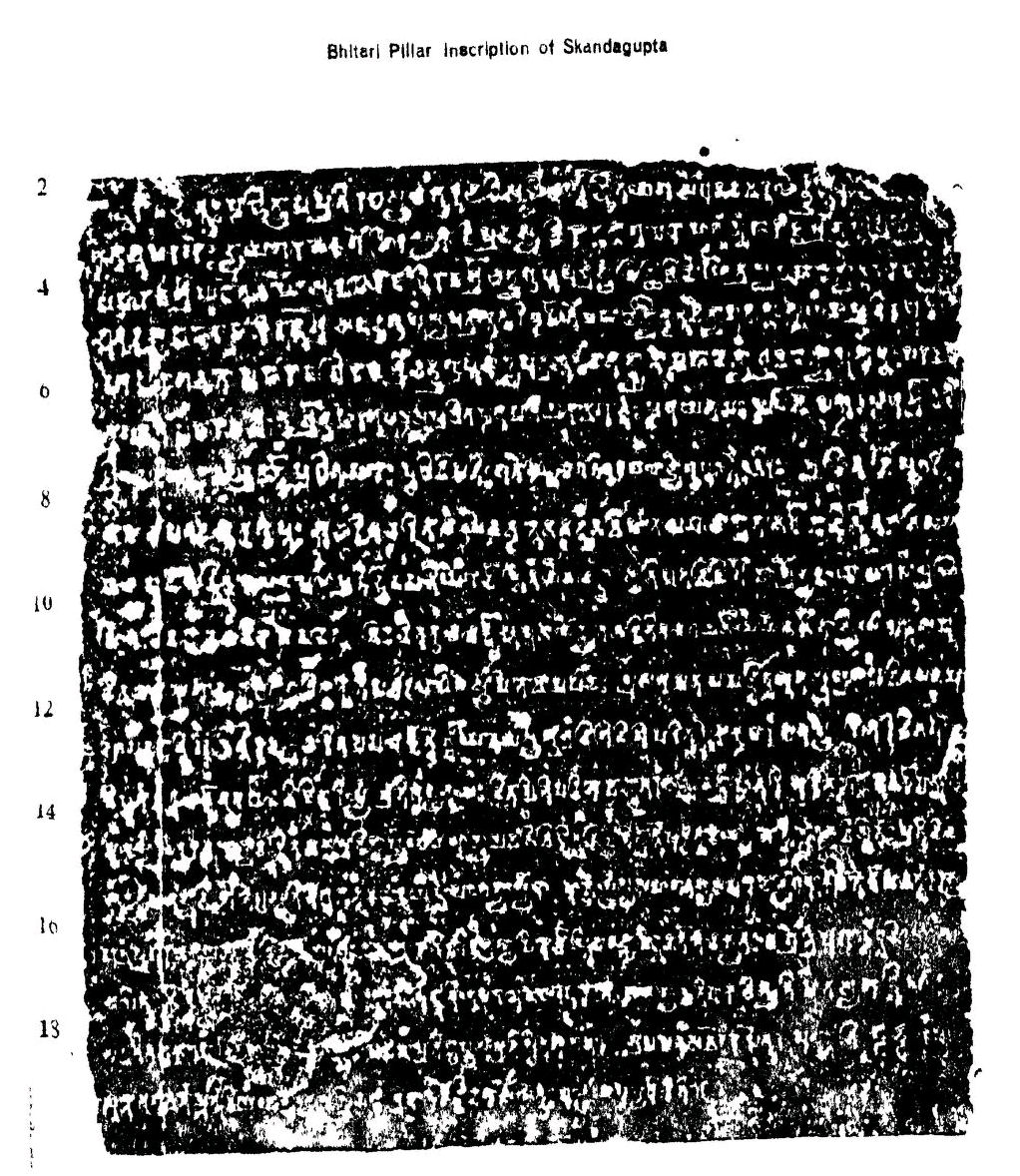
The Bhitari pillar and inscription of Skandagupta
Location of Bhitari, Ghazipur, Uttar Pradesh, in India.

The Bhitari pillar inscription of Skandagupta was discovered in the village of Bhitari near Saidpur in Uttar Pradesh and dates to the reign of Gupta Empire ruler Skandagupta (c. 455 – c. 467 CE). Further, the inscription is written in Sanskrit and is 15 feet high.

Among other things, the inscription is extremely important in understanding the chronology of the various Gupta rulers. It also mentions the conflict between Skandagupta and the Pushyamitras as well as the Hunas.

== Inscription ==
The inscription is written in 19 lines, starting with the genealogy of the ancestors of Skandagupta, then a presentation of Skangupta himself, and finally a presentation of his achievements.

=== Genealogy ===
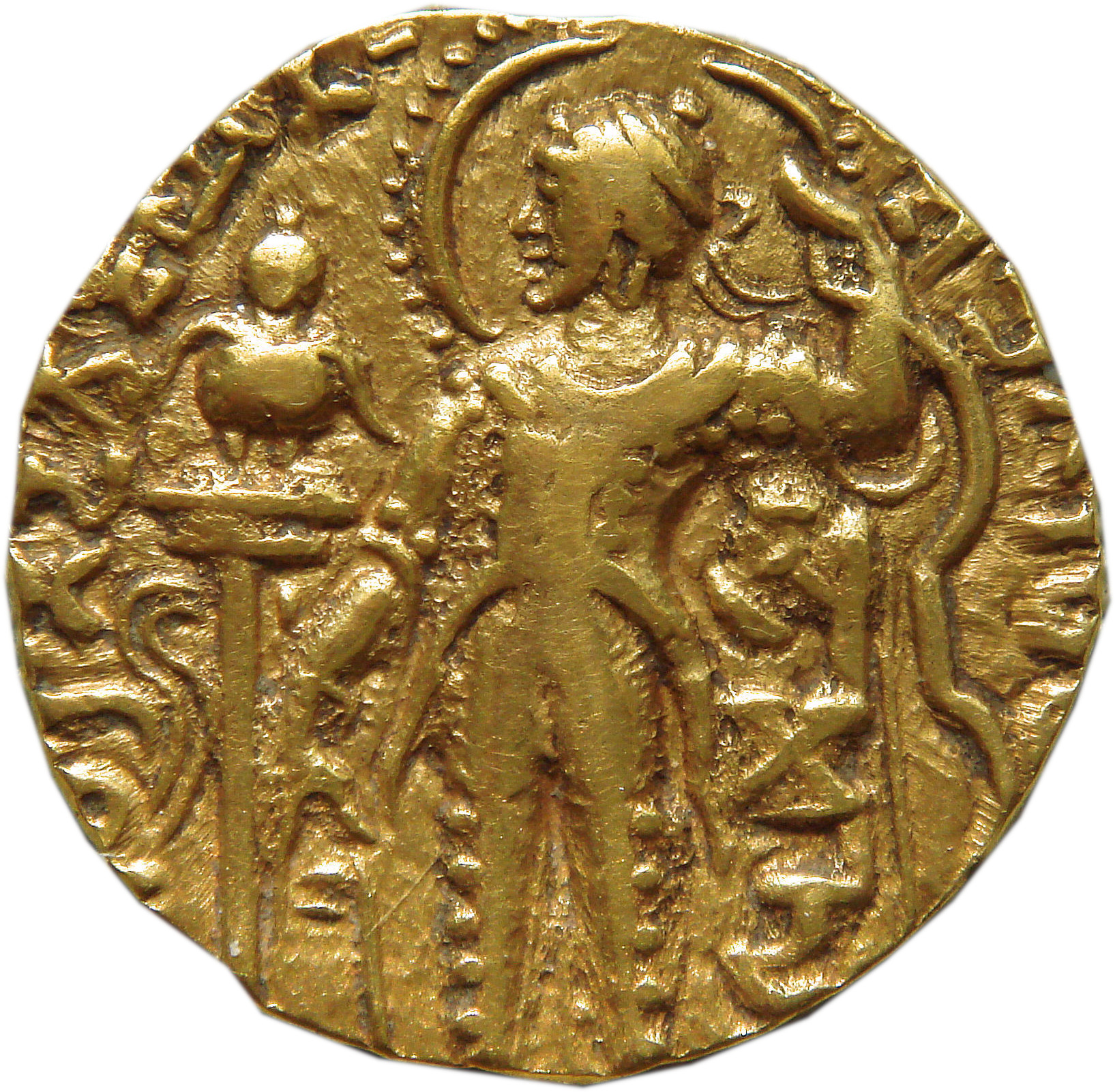
Emperor Samudragupta (336-80).

- [Perfection has been attained]! The son of the Mahârâjâdhirâja, the glorious Samudragupta, who was the exterminator of all kings; who had no antagonist (of equal power) in the world; whose fame was tasted by the waters of the four oceans; who was equal to (the gods) Dhanada and Varuna and Indra and Antaka; who was the very axe of (the god) Kritanta (God of Death); who was the giver of many millions of lawfully acquired cows and gold; who was the restorer of the ashvamedha-sacrifice, that had been long in abeyance; who was the son of the son's son of the Mahârâja, the illustrious Gupta; who was the son's son of the Mahârâja, the illustrious Ghatôtkacha; (and) who was the son of the Mahârâjâdhirâja, the glorious Chandragupta (I), (and) the daughter's son of Lichchhivi, begotten on the Mahâdêvî Kumrâdêvî,
- (L 4.)-(was) the most devout worshiper of the Divine One, the Mahârâjadhirâja, the glorious Chandragupta (II), who was accepted by him; who was begotten on the Mahdâdêvî Dattadêvî; (and) who was himself without an antagonist (of equal power).
- (L.5.)-His son (was) the most devout worshipper of the Divine One, the Mahârâjadhirâja, the glorious Kumâragupta, who meditated on his feet, (and) who was begotten on the Mahdâdêvî Dhruvadêvî.

=== Self-presentation of Skandagupta ===
- (L. 6.)-The son of him, the king, who was renowned for the innate power of (his) mighty intellect (and) whose fame was great, (is) this (present) king, by name Skandagupta, who possesses great glory; who subsisted (like a bee) on the wide-spreading waterlilies which were the feet of (his) father; whose fame is spread far and wide; -who is amply endowed with strength of arm in the world; who is the most eminent hero in the lineage of the Guptas; whose great splendour is spread far and wide; by whom, practicing (good) behaviour, the conduct of those who perform good actions is not obstructed; who is of spotless soul; (and) who is well disciplined in the understanding of musical keys:-
- (L. 8.)-By whom,-having, with a daily intense application, step by step attained his object by means of good behaviour and strength and politic conduct,-instruction in the art of disposition (of resources) was acquired, (and) was employed as the means of (subduing his) enemies who had put themselves forward in the desire for conquest that was so highly welcome (to them) :-

==== Defeat of the Pushyamitras ====
- (L. 10.)-By whom, when he prepared himself to restore the fallen fortunes of (his) family, a (whole) night was spent on a couch that was the bare earth; and then, having conquered the Pushyamitras, who had developed great power and wealth, he placed (his) left foot on a foot-stool which was the king (of that tribe himself ) :-

==== Military prowesses of Skandagupta ====
- (L. 11.)-The resplendent behaviour of whom, possessed of spotless fame,-inherent, [but increased] by . . . . . . . . and patience and heroism which are emphatically unequaled, (and) which destroy the efficacy of the weapons (of his enemies),-is sung in every region by happy men, even down to the children:
- (L. 12.)-Who, when (his) father had attained the skies, conquered (his) enemies by the strength of (his) arm, and established again the ruined fortunes of (his) lineage; and then, crying "the victory has been achieved" betook himself to (his) mother, whose eyes were full of tears from joy, just as Krishna, when he had slain (his) enemies, betook himself to (his mother) Dêvakî;-
- (L. 14.)-Who, with his own armies, established (again) (his) lineage that had been made to totter . . . . . . . . . .. ., (and) with his two arms subjugated the earth, (and) shewed mercy to the conquered peoples in distress, (but) has become neither proud nor arrogant, though his glory is increasing day by day; (and) whom the bards raise to distinction with (their) songs and praises:-

==== Defeat of the Hunas (Kidarites) ====
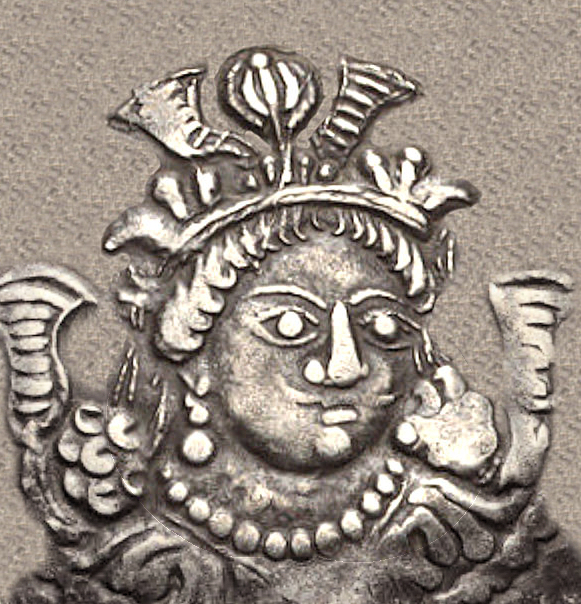
Portrait of the Huna Kidarites king Kidara, circa 350-386.

- (L. 15.)-By whose two arms the earth was shaken, when he, the creator (of a disturbance like that) of a terrible whirlpool, joined in close conflict with the Hûnas; . . . . . . among enemies . . . . . . arrows . . . . . . . . . . . . proclaimed . . . . . . . . . . . . just as if it were the roaring of (the river) Gangâ, making itself noticed in (their) ears.
- (L.17.)- . . . . . . the fame of his father . . . . . . . . . . . (Saying to himself that) an image of some kind or other [should be made], he, the very celebrated one, made this image of that (famous) (god) Shârngin, [to endure as long as the moon and stars may last]. And, having here installed this (god), he, whose commands are well-established, has allotted this village (to the idol), in order to increase the religious merit of (his) father.
- (L. 19.)-Accordingly, this image of the Divine One, and (this village) which has been here agreed to, -both of these, he, the pious-minded one, has assigned for (the increase of ) the religious merit of (his) father.

== See also ==
- Kahaum pillar
