= Pushyamitras =

Ancient Indian tribe

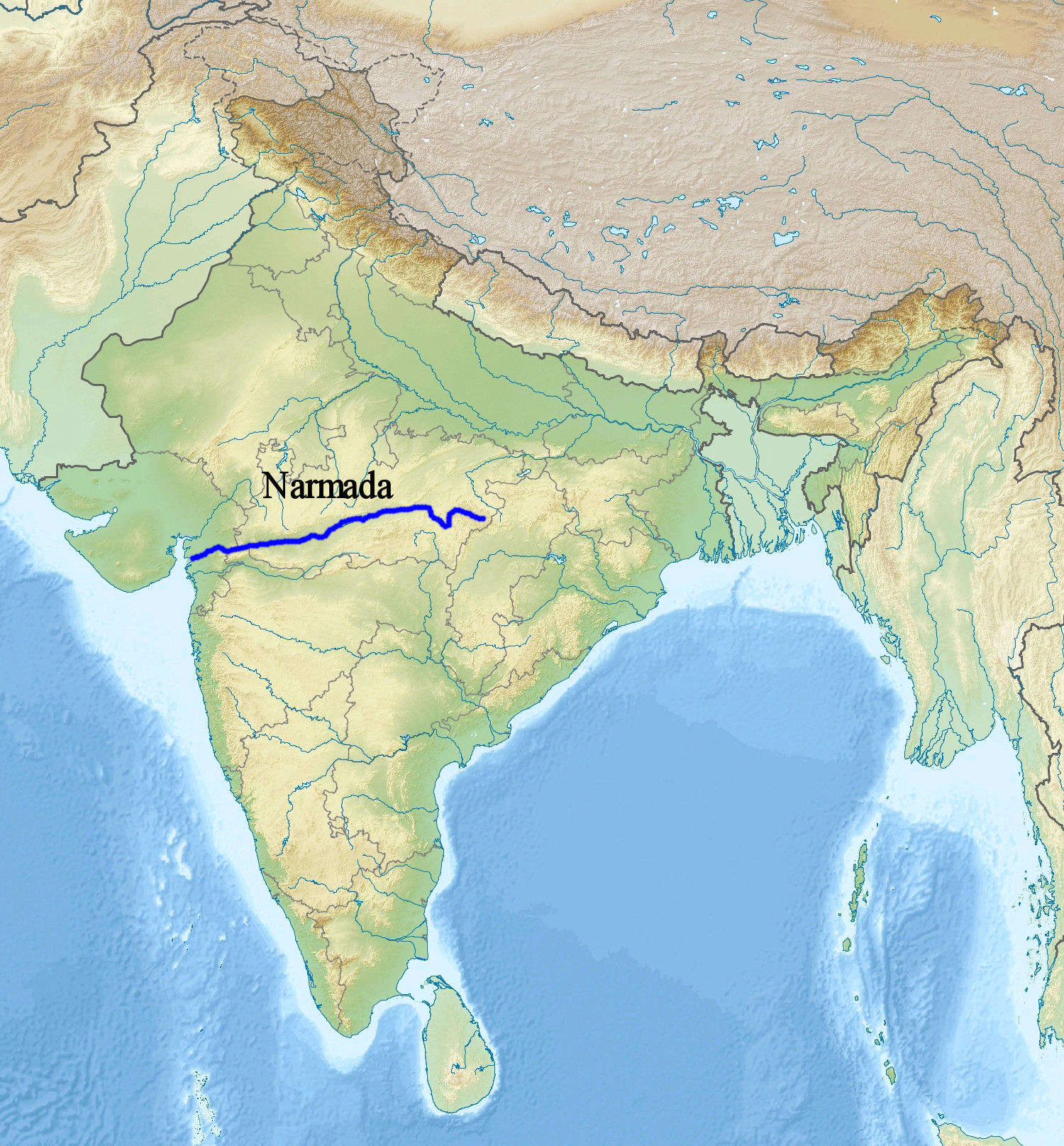
The Pushyamitras lived on the banks of the Narmada River.

Political situation in India in 450 CE.

The Pushyamitras were a tribe who lived in Central India during the 5th century CE. Living on the banks of the river Narmada, they are believed to have posed a serious threat to the Gupta Empire during the late period of Kumaragupta I's reign.

== Origin ==
A comprehensive study of Puranic, geographical, epigraphic, epic, and historical evidence led historian K. P. Jayaswal to conclude that the Pushyamitras were none other than the Abhira-Yadava people. According to him, the Abhira-Yadava community appeared under various names across different historical periods in the western Indian region, being known as the Andhaka-Vrishnis and Bhojas in the Mahabharata era, the Rastrikas and Bhojas during Asoka's time, the Abhiras under Samudragupta, and the Pusyamitras during the reigns of Kumaragupta I and Skandagupta, with the Pusyamitras representing one of its historical branches. German Indologist Rudolf Hoernle identified the Pushyamitras with the Maitrakas of Vallabhi. The Maitrakas are also regarded by several historians as a branch of the Yadavas.

== History ==
The Puranas record thirteen kings of the Pushyamitra dynasty and have been placed in the 3rd century of the Common Era.

=== Existence ===
The Pushyamitras are only known from the inscription of Skandagupta in which he emphasizes his role in defeating the Pushyamitras, of which the reading is sometimes disputed (it could be "Yudhy-amitrdths-cha" rather than "Pushyamitrams-cha"), as well as a single mention in the Puranas. Therefore their existence is sometimes doubted. The people Skandagupta fought could more probably have been a confederation including the Vakatakas. The dynasty of the Vakatakas ended around that time in a war, when, according to the Dashakumaracharita, attacking the area of Vanavasi to the south, they were in turn attacked from the rear resulting in the death of the last Vakataka king.

=== War against the Guptas ===
Inscription covering the events between 455 and 467 CE emphasize the role of Skandagupta, Kumaragupta's successor, in defeating the Pushyamitras.

By whom, when [Skandagupta] prepared himself to restore the fallen fortunes of (his) family, a (whole) night was spent on a couch that was the bare earth; and then, having conquered the Pushyamitras, who had developed great power and wealth, he placed (his) left foot on a footstool which was the king (of that tribe himself).

— Line 10, Bhitari pillar inscription of Skandagupta

The Pushyamitras were subjugated by Skandagupta after a long and strenuous fight, as they "had developed great power and many resources in terms of military & wealth".The inscription says that at one point the situation became so serious that Skandagupta had to pass a whole night on the bare ground (the field). The critical situation was eventually tided over by him & emerged victorious.This victory took place towards the close of Kumaragupta's reign. So Kumaragupta was probably too old to lead the army himself. So his son Skandagupta bore the brunt of the struggle, who was chosen by him to deal with the danger of the Pushyamitras. This victory was so memorable & important, we are told in the Bhitari inscription that people sang the songs of his glory in every nook and corner of the empire. Goyal thinks that the Pandumvamshi king Bharatabala was the king leading the Pushyamitra rebellion.

== See also ==
- Vardhana dynasty
