= Kumaragupta I =

Gupta emperor from 415 to 455

- Maharajadhiraja; Mahendrāditya
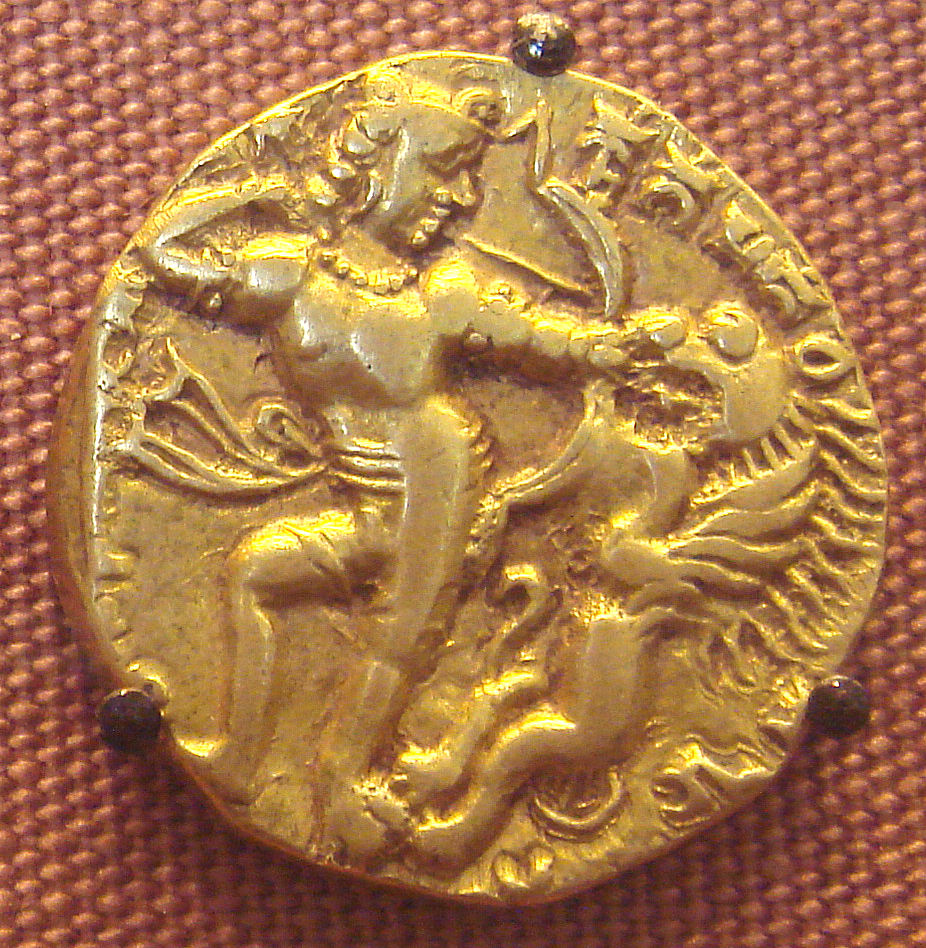
- Kumaragupta fighting a lion, as depicted on his gold coin

Gupta emperor
- Reign: c. 415 – c. 455 CE
- Predecessor: Chandragupta II
- Successor: Skandagupta
- Died: c. 455 CE
- Spouse: Anantadevi
- Issue: Skandagupta; Purugupta
- Dynasty: Gupta
- Father: Chandragupta II
- Mother: Dhruvadevi
- Religion: Hinduism

Kumaragupta I (Note: Gupta script: Ku-ma-ra-gu-pta,) alias Mahendraditya was the Gupta emperor from c. 415 until his death in c. 455 CE. A son of the Gupta emperor Chandragupta II and Queen Dhruvadevi, he likely retained sovereignty over the inherited realm, which extended from what is present-day Gujarat in the west to present-day Bengal region in the east.

Kumaragupta performed an Ashvamedha sacrifice, which was usually performed to prove imperial sovereignty, although no concrete information is available about his military achievements. Based on the epigraphic and numismatic evidence, some modern historians have theorized that he may have subdued the Aulikaras of central India and the Traikutakas of western India. The Nalanda mahavihara was possibly built during his reign.

The Bhitari pillar inscription states that his successor Skandagupta restored the fallen fortunes of the Gupta family, which has led to suggestions that during his last years, Kumaragupta suffered reverses, possibly against the Pushyamitras or the Hunas. However, this cannot be said with certainty, and the situation described in the Bhitari inscription may have been the result of events that happened after his death.

== Early life ==
Kumaragupta was a son of the Gupta emperor Chandragupta II and Queen Dhruvadevi. Chandragupta's last inscription is dated c. 412 CE, while Kumaragupta's earliest inscription is dated c. 415 CE (year 96 of the Gupta era). Therefore, Kumaragupta must have ascended the throne in or shortly before 415 CE.

Kumaragupta bore the titles Maharajadhiraja, Parama-bhattaraka, and Paramadvaita. He also adopted the title Mahendraditya, and his coins call him by several variants of this name, including Shri-Mahendra, Mahendra-simha, and Ashvamedha-Mahendra. Shakraditya, the name of a king mentioned in Buddhist texts, may also have been the title of Kumaragupta (see #Religion section).

== Reign ==
Kumaragupta had inherited a large empire built upon the conquests of his father Chandragupta II and his grandfather Samudragupta. No concrete information is available about his military achievements. The inscriptions issued during his reign have been discovered in Madhya Pradesh, Uttar Pradesh, West Bengal, and Bangladesh; an inscription of his son has been discovered in Gujarat. In addition, his garuda-inscribed coins have been discovered in western India, and his peacock-inscribed coins have been discovered in the Ganges valley. This suggests that he was able to maintain control over the vast territory that he inherited. Thus, even if his reign was militarily uneventful, he must have been a strong ruler for being able to maintain a stable government in a large empire, as indicated by epigraphic and numismatic evidence.

There are some indications that Kumaragupta's reign was not devoid of wars and disturbances. For example, he worshipped the war god Karttikeya, and his gold coins suggest that he performed the Ashvamedha ceremony which was used by ancient kings to prove their sovereignty. However, since there is no concrete information available about any military conquest by him, it is not certain if this performance is indicative of any conquests.

=== Possible invasion of Traikutaka territory ===
Kumaragupta's coins have been found in present-day Maharashtra, which was located to the south-west of the core Gupta territory. These include 13 coins from Achalpur, and a hoard of 1395 silver coins from Samand in Satara district. His coins discovered from south Gujarat resemble the coins issued by the Traikutaka dynasty, which ruled this region. This has led to suggestions that Kumaragupta defeated the Traikutakas.

=== Possible annexation of Dashapura ===
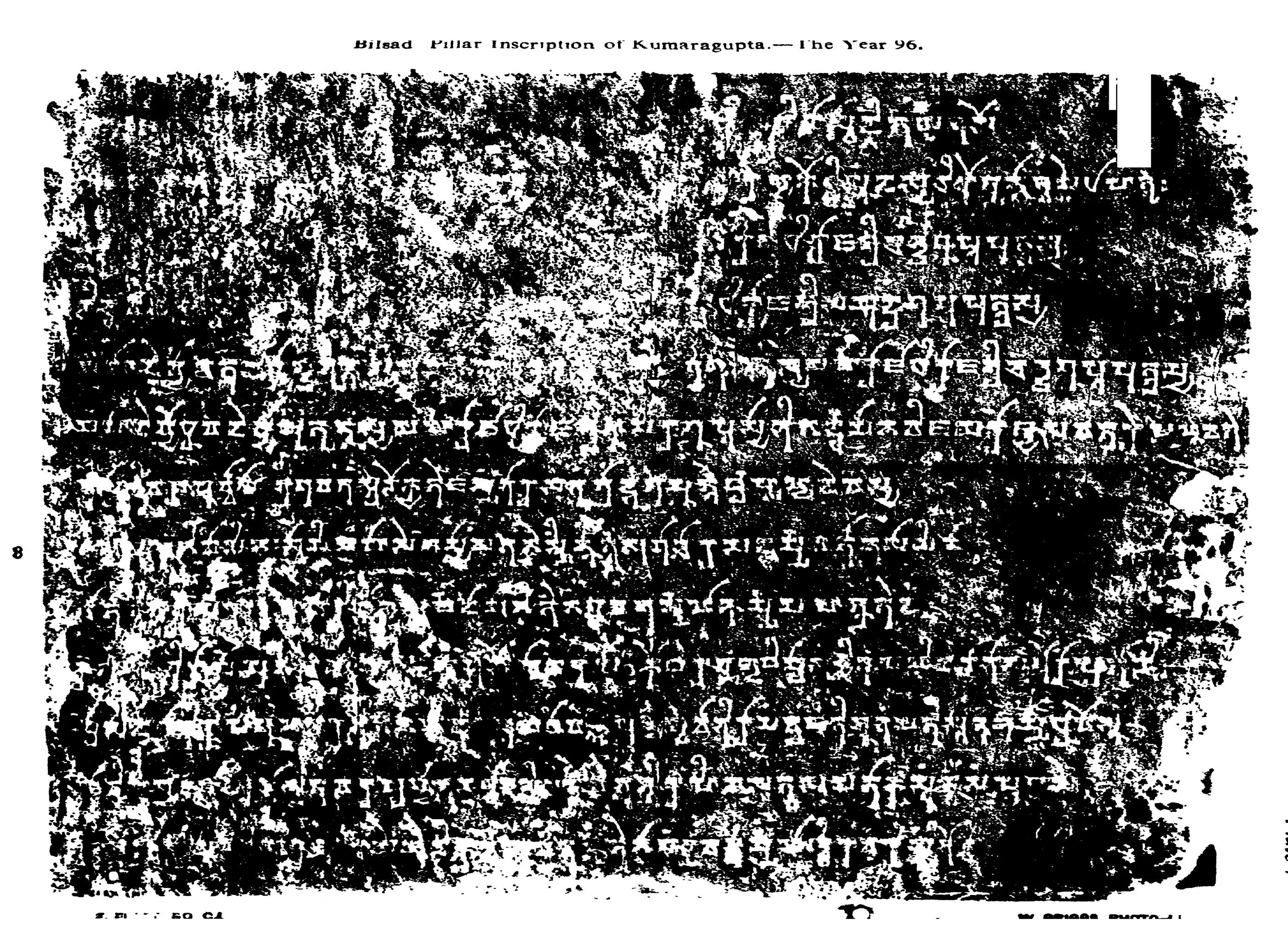
Bilsad pillar inscription of Kumaragupta, in the Year 96 of the Gupta era (415-416 CE).

The 423 CE Mandsaur inscription mentions a line of kings whose name ends with -varman, who probably had their capital at Dashapura (modern Mandsaur). The inscription describes one of these kings, Nara-varman, as an "Aulikara", which seems to have been the dynasty's name. The inscription describes a guild of silk-weavers who had migrated from the Lata region of present-day Gujarat to Dashapura. It then abruptly moves away from this topic and mentions "while Kumaragupta was ruling the whole earth". It further states that a sun temple was built in c. 436 CE during the reign of Nara-varman's grandson Bandhu-varman: it was later destroyed or damaged by other kings, and the guild had it repaired it in c. 473 CE.

According to one theory, Bandhuvarman ruled Dashapura as a feudatory of Kumaragupta I, the subject of this article. However, historian R. C. Majumdar argues that the "Kumaragupta" referred to in the inscription is the later king Kumaragupta II. According to Majumdar's theory, the temple was built in c. 436 CE when Bandhuvarman ruled as a sovereign, and was repaired in c. 473 CE during the reign of Kumaragupta II. Bandhuvarman's grandfather Naravarman and his father Vishvavarman seem to have been independent rulers, because none of the three inscriptions issued during their reigns refer to a Gupta overlord. Therefore, according to Majumdar, irrespective of who the "Kumaragupta" mentioned in the Mandsaur inscription is, the Dashapura area seems to have been annexed to the Gupta empire sometime after this inscription was issued, that is, during c. 424-473 CE. Majumdar theorizes that the Dashapura region was annexed to the Gupta empire during the reign of Kumaragupta I, either through military conquest or diplomacy.

=== Other possible campaigns ===
Some coins of Kumaragupta's coins depict him as a rhinoceros-slayer, which some scholars such as Tej Ram Sharma see as possible evidence of his successes against the king of Kamarupa in present-day Assam, where the Indian rhinoceros is abundant. Another category of his coins portray him as a tiger-slayer, which according to historian H. C. Raychaudhuri, may allude to his incursions of the territory to the south of the Narmada River, where tigers are abundant. However, historian S. R. Goyal dismisses both of these coin-based theories as fanciful.

== Administration ==
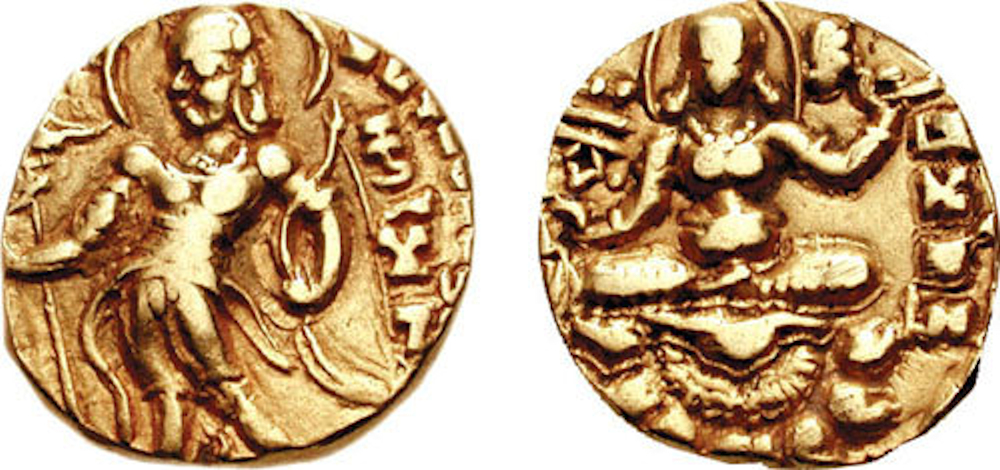
Kumaragupta I, "Archer type" coin. King Kumaragupta, nimbate, holding arrow and bow with Garuda standard behind. Brahmi Legend Ku-ma-ra vertically to the right. Reverse: Goddess Lakshmi, seated facing on open lotus, holding diadem and lotus. Circa 415-455 CE.

Epigraphic evidence suggests that Kumaragupta ruled his empire through governors (Uparikas), who bore the title Maharaja ("great king"), and administered various provinces (Bhuktis). The districts (vishayas) of the provinces were administered by district magistrates (Vishyapatis), who were supported by an advisory council comprising:

- the town president or mayor (Nagara-Shreshtin)
- the representative of the merchant guild (Sarthavaha)
- the chief of the artisan guild (Prathama-Kulika)
- the chief of the guild of writers or scribes (Prathama-Kayastha)

Ghatotkacha-gupta (not to be confused with his ancestor Ghatotkacha) governed the Eran region during Kumaragupta's reign. His c. 435-436 inscription suggests that he was a member of the Gupta royal family, probably a son or younger brother of Kumaragupta. He is most probably same as the Ghatotkacha-gupta mentioned in a seal found at Vaishali, and the Ghatotkacha-gupta who is known to have issued a gold coin. He may have assumed independence for a short period, possibly after the death of Kumaragupta.

Chirata-datta ruled the Pundravardhana-bhukti (province) in present-day Bengal as a subordinate of Kumaragupta. His known dates range from c. 443 to c. 447 (years 124-128 of the Gupta era).

The 436 CE Karamdanda inscription mentions Prithivishena, who was initially mantrin and kumaramatya (minister) of Kumaragupta I, and later became his mahabaladhikrita (general). His father Shikharasvamin had served Chandragupta II as a mantrin and kumaramatya.

Kumaragupta seems to have established diplomatic relations with the Liu Sung emperors of China, as suggested by visits of Chinese delegations to India, and the exchange of an Indian envoy.

== Personal life ==
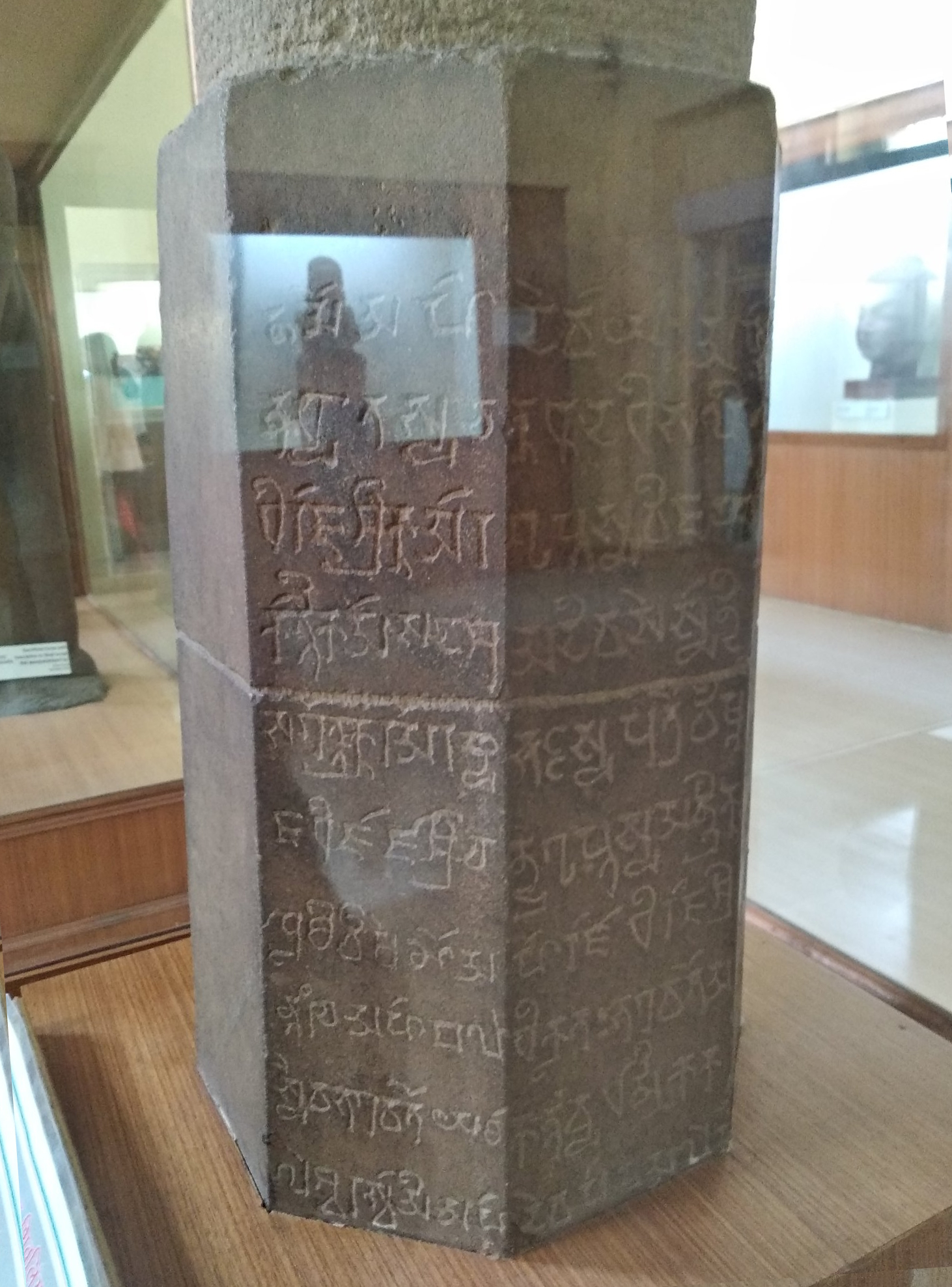
Shivling with an inscription dedicated to gupta year "117" dating to kumaragupta I reign

Kumaragupta had at least two sons: Skandagupta and Purugupta. The inscriptions of Skandagupta, who became the next king, do not mention the name of his mother, in a departure from the tradition. Purugupta was the son of Mahadevi (queen) Anantadevi. Historian R. N. Dandekar theorizes that Anantadevi was a Kadamba princess, as the Talagunda pillar inscription suggests that the Kadamba king Kakusthavarman established a matrimonial alliance with the Guptas.

The Bihar stone pillar inscription of Skandagupta suggests that Kumaragupta also married the sister of one of his ministers. As mentioned above, Ghatotkacha-gupta (not to be confused with the earlier king Ghatotkacha) was probably a son or younger brother of Kumaragupta.

The Chinese traveler Xuanzang mentions Budhagupta after king Shakraditya (identified as Kumaragupta I by some scholars) while naming the patrons of the Nalanda monastery. Based on this, historian R. K. Mukherjee theorizes that Budhagupta was also a son of Kumaragupta I. However, the epigraphic evidence makes it clear that Budhagupta was a son of Kumaragupta II, not Kumaragupta I.

== Religion ==
Epigraphic evidence indicates that various faiths including Shaivism, Vaishnavism, Buddhism, and Jainism, flourished during Kumaragupta's reign. Kumaragupta's silver coins describe him as a devotee of the god Vishnu (parama-bhagavata or bhagavata). His gold, silver, and copper coins feature Vishnu's vahana Garuda. He was also a devotee of the war god Karttikeya (also known as Skanda): his coins feature Karttikeya seated on a peacock. He named his son Skandagupta after the god, and his own name "Kumara" appears to have been based on another name of the god.

He may have built Buddhist monasteries at Nalanda. According to the Buddhist writers Xuanzang (7th century) and Prajnavarman (8th century), the University at Nalanda was established by a king called Shakraditya. Modern scholars identify king Shakraditya with Kumaragupta based on the following points:

- "Shakra" and "Mahendra" are names of the Indian deity Indra, and Kumaragupta bore the title Mahendraditya.
- The earlier Chinese traveler Faxian, who toured India during 400-411 CE does not mention the existence of any monastery at Nalanda, which was located near other places visited by him, such as Pataliputra and Gaya. The omission of such an important Buddhist site in University can be explained by the assumption that the monastery in Nalanda was established after 411 CE, during the reign of Kumaragupta.

Xuanzang mentions Budhagupta (a successor of the later king Kumaragupta II) after Shakraditya: he states the monastery was enriched by the endowments of the kings Shakraditya, Budhagupta, Tathagatagupta, and Baladitya. This casts some doubt on the identification of Shakraditya with Kumaragupta I.

== Last years ==
Mankuwar Buddha
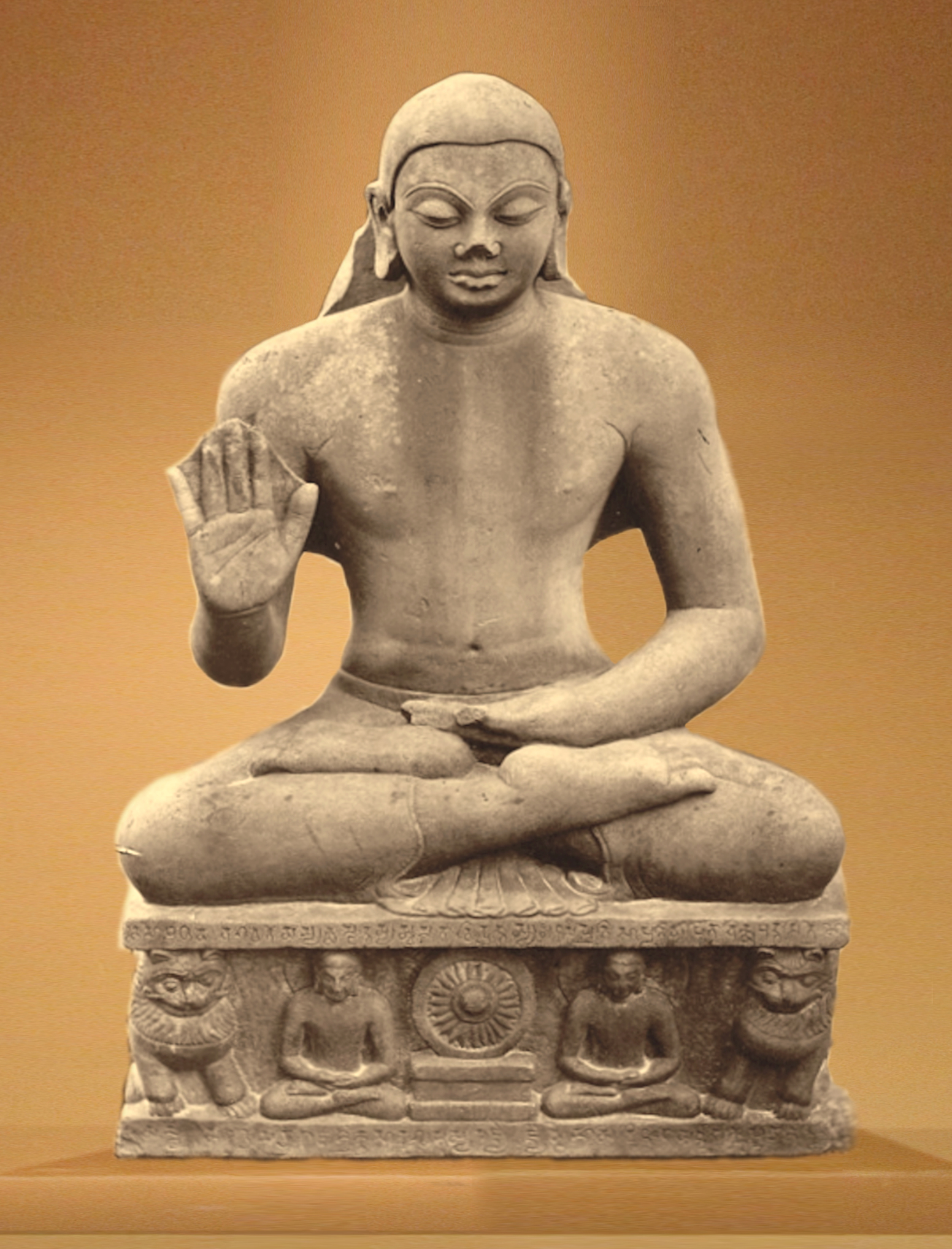
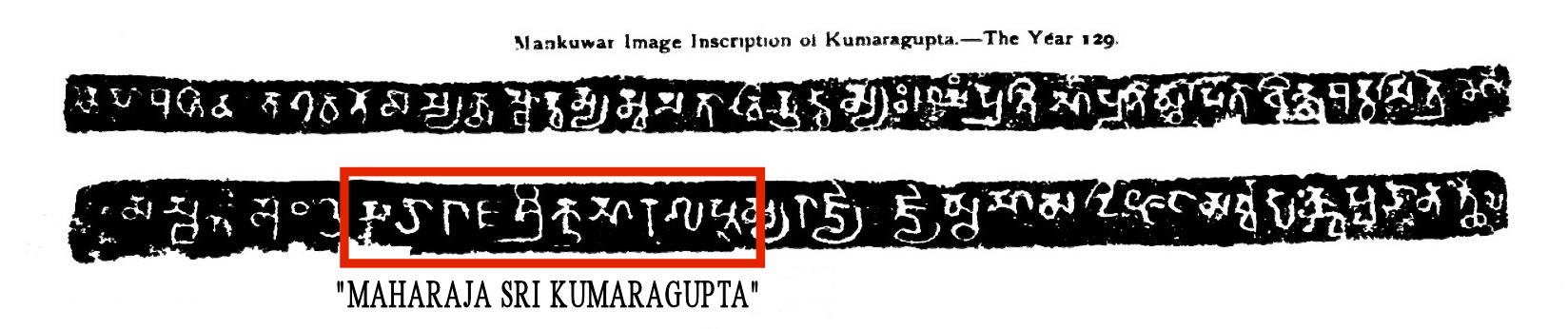
The Mankuwar Buddha, dated to the end of the reign of Kumaragupta I in 448 CE, only uses the title Maharaja ( "Great King") in the inscription "in the year 129, in the reign of the Maharaja, the glorious Kumaragupta". Mankuwar, District of Allahabad. Gupta art, Lucknow Museum.

The earliest known regnal date of Kumaragupta's son Skandagupta is c. 455 CE (year 136 of the Gupta era). This proves that Kumaragupta's reign ended in or before this year. Historian V. A. Smith read the dates on some of Kumaragupta's coins as c. 455 CE (years 134 and 135 of the Gupta era), based on which modern scholars theorize that Kumaragupta ruled until 455 CE. However, numismatist P. L. Gupta has disputed Smith's reading, and has dated the end of Kumaragupta's reign to c. 450 CE.

According to one theory, the later years of Kumaragupta's reign were not peaceful. This theory is based on the c. 448 CE Mankuwar Buddha inscription issued during Kumaragupta's reign, and the Bhitari pillar inscription of Skandagupta:

- The Bhitari inscription states that Skandagupta defeated his enemies and re-established the "ruined fortunes" of his family when his father died, and then visited his mother whose "eyes were full of tears of joy". The enemies mentioned in the inscriptions include the Pushyamitras or the Hunas; an alternative interpretation reads "yudhyamitras" (a generic term for enemies) instead of Pushyamitras.
- The Mankuwar Buddha inscribed with "year 129 in the reign of Great King Kumaragupta" (448 CE, at the end of the reign of Kumaragupta) only uses the feudatory title Maharaja ("Great King") for Kumaragupta instead of the imperial title Maharajadhiraja ("Great King of Kings"). This has led to suggestions that he suffered reverses in the later part of his reign, possibly against the Pushyamitras or the Hunas.

However, it cannot be said with certainty that Kumaragupta faced trouble during his last years. For example, it is possible that the drafter of the Man Kuwar inscription used a wrong title simply because of carelessness or ignorance. Thus, it is possible that the troubles referred to in the Bhitari inscription occurred after Kumaragupta's death: these troubles probably resulted from a disputed succession to the throne, and caused a civil war. However, this is a mere conjecture, and according to another theory, the situation described in the Bhitari inscription may have been the result of a Huna invasion. This theory is based on the Junagadh inscription which suggests that Skandagupta defeated the mlechchhas (foreigners, possibly the Hunas) before c. 455 CE. It is also possible that both of these theories are true: Skandagupta may have been dispatched to the frontier to check a Huna invasion; meanwhile, Kumaragupta died in the capital, leading to a succession dispute.

According to one theory, Kumaragupta's sons Skandagupta and Purugupta may have been involved in a succession dispute. Another possibility is that Purugupta - the son of the chief queen - was a minor at the time of Kumaragupta I's death, because of which Skandagupta - the son of a junior queen - ascended the throne. Skandagupta succeeded Kumaragupta, and was succeeded by Purugupta, whose descendants became the subsequent kings.

== Coinage ==
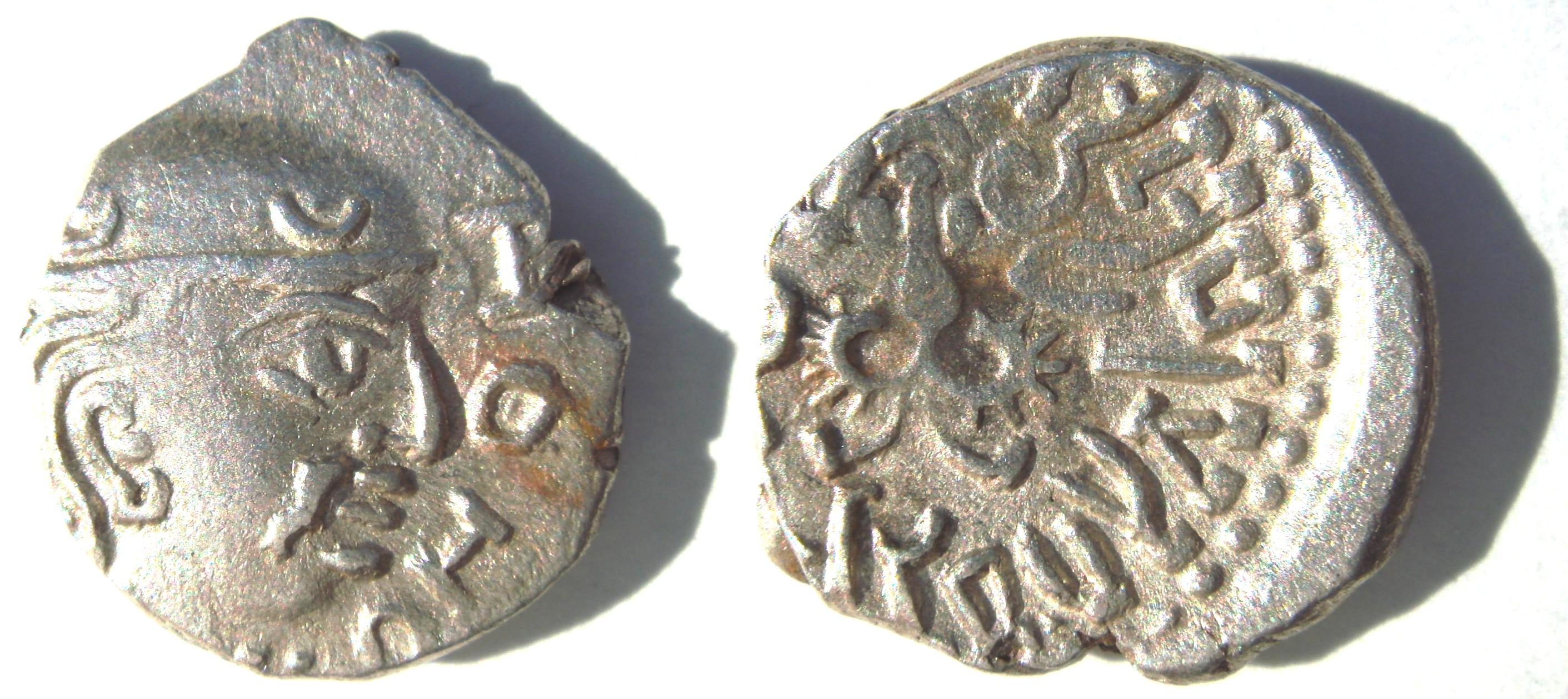
Silver coin of Kumaragupta. Obv: Bust of King Kumaragupta with cap decorated with crescents. Rev: Garuda bird, circled by legend in Brahmi "Parama-bhagavata rajadhiraja Sri Kumaragupta Mahendraditya" ("Most devout King of Kings Kumaragupta Mahendraditya").

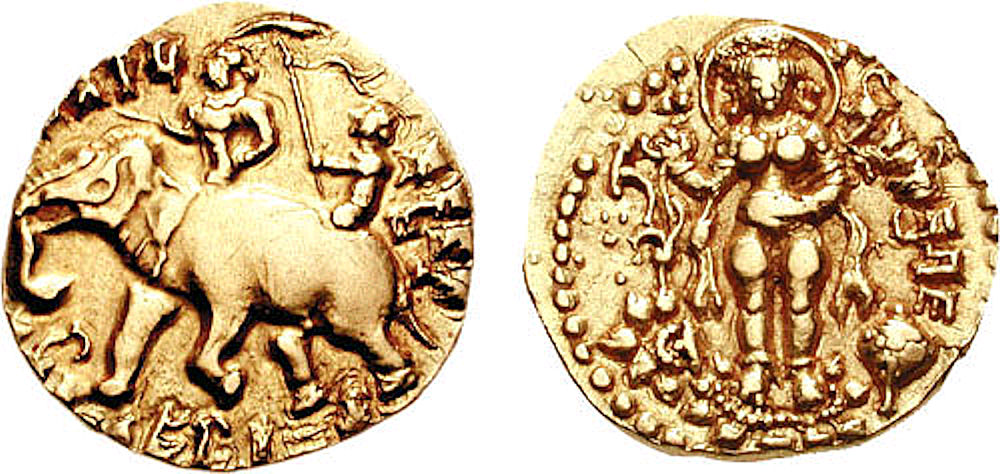
Elephant-rider coin of Kumaragupta. Obverse legend: "Kumaragupta, who has destroyed his enemies and protected his client kings, is victorious over his foes".

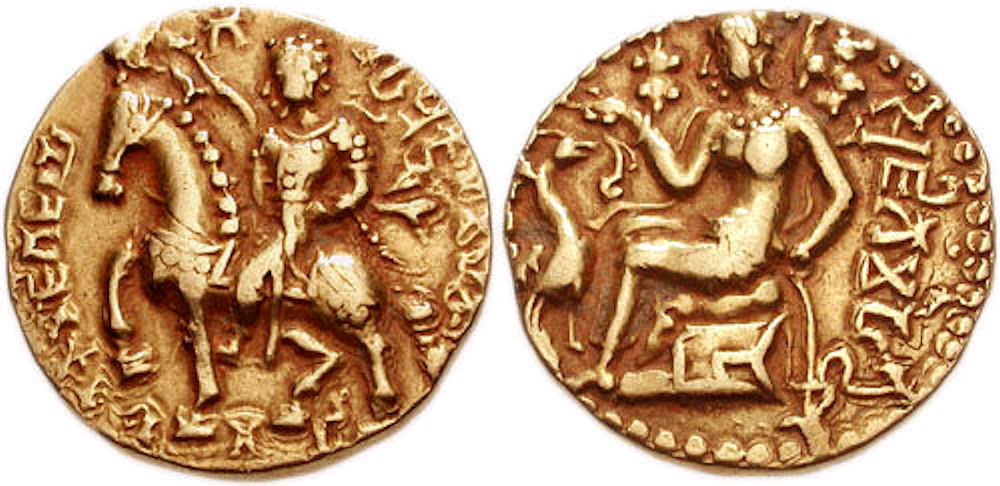
Horseman type coin of Kumaragupta. Circa 415-455 CE.

Among the Gupta kings, Kumaragupta issued the largest varieties of coins. His 628 coins in the Bayana hoard belong to 14 different types.

The varieties of his coins include the following:

- Archer type: Similar to the archer-type coins of Chandragupta II. The reverse legend reads Shri-Mahendrah. The coins appear in several varieties, with different obverse legends:
  - Mahdrajadhiraja-Shri-Kumdraguptah ("King of kings, the illustrious Kumaragupta")
  - Gunesho mahitalam jayati Kumarah ("Prominent in merit Kumara conquers the world")
  - Vijitavanir avanipatih Kumaragupto divam jayati ("King Kumaragupta who has conquered the earth wins heaven")
  - Jayati mahitalam Shri-Kumaraguptah ("The illustrious Kumaragupta conquers the earth")
  - Jayati mahitalam Shri-Kumaraguptah sudhanvi ("The excellent archer, the illustrious Kumaragupta conquers the earth")
  - Parama-rajadhiraja-Shri-Kumaragupta ("The illustrious Kumaragupta, the highest king of kings")
- Horseman type: Similar to the horseman-type coins of Chandragupta II, but the reverse of some of these coins features a new image, that of a goddess feeding a peacock, with the legend Ajita-Mahendrah ("Undefeated Mahendra"). The coins appears in several sub-types, with different obverse legends:
  - Prithvital-ambarashashi Kumaragupto jayaty-ajitah ("The moon in the firmament of the earth, the invincible Kumaragupta is victorious")
  - Jayati nripo ribhir-ajitah ("Victorious is the king who is never defeated by the enemies")
  - Kshitipatir-ajito vijayi Kumaragupto divam jayati ("The unconquered and victorious king Kumaragupta wins the heaven")
  - Guptakula-vyoma-shashi jayaty-ajeyo jita Mahendrah ("The unconquered and invincible Mahendra, who is a moon in the sky of the Gupta family, is victorious")
  - Guptakul-amalachandro Mahendrakarm-ajito jayati ("The Spotless Moon [in the firmament] of the Gupta family, the invincible hero who is valorous as Indra, is victorious")
  - Kshitipatir-ajito vijayi Kumaragupto jayaty-ajitah ("The invincible and victorious king Kumaragupta carries the day, being undefeated")
  - Prithvi-taleshvarendrah Kumaragupto jayaty-ajitah ("The lord of the rulers of this earth, the invincible Kumaragupta is victorious")
- Swordsman type: A new type introduced by Kumaragupta. Bears an image of the king holding the sword, with a garuda emblem, and the legend Gamavajitya sucharitaih Kumaragupto divam jayati ("Having conquered the earth, Kumaragupta wins the heaven by his meritorious deeds"). The obverse depicts goddess Lakshmi sitting on a lotus, and bears the legend Shri-Kumaraguptah.
- Lion-slayer type: Similar to the lion-slayer-type coins of Chandragupta II. The reverse bears the legend Shri-Mahendrasimhaah or Simha-Mahendrah. The coins appear in several sub-types, with different obverse legends:
  - Kshitipatir-ajita-Mahendrah Kumaragupto divam jayati ("Kumaragupta, unconquered Mahendra, the lord of earth, wins heaven")
  - Kumaragupto vijayi simha-Mahendro divam jayati ("The victorious Kumaragupta, lion-like Mahendra, wins the heaven"")
  - Kumaragupto yudhi simhavikramah ("Kumaragupta, who is as valorous in the battle as a lion")
  - Sakshadiva Narasimho simha-Mahendro jayatyanisham ("Narasimha, as it were incarnate, the lion-like Mahendra is ever victorious")
- Tiger-slayer type: Similar to the tiger-slayer-type coins of his grandfather Samudragupta. The reverse side of Kumaragupta's coins feature a new image: that of a goddess standing on a crocodile, and feeding a peacock. The obverse legend reads Shriman vyaghra-bala-parakramah ("The glorious [king] whose prowess is like that of a tiger". The reverse legend reads Kumaraguptodhiraja.
- Elephant-rider: Shows the king riding a caparisoned elephant using a goad, with an attendant holding an umbrella over his head. The legend reads Kshataripu-Kumaragupto rajatrata jayati ripun ("Kumaragupta, who has destroyed his enemies and protects [subordinate] kings, is victorious over his foes." The reverse features goddess Lakshmi standing on a lotus, with the legend Shri-Mahendragajah ("The elephant of the illustrious Mahendra").
- Elephant-rider lion-slayer type: Similar to the elephant-rider type, but the king is shown holding a dagger to slay a lion in front of the elephant. The reverse is also similar, but the goddess holds an indistinct object in her hand, which a peacock is looking at. The reverse legend reads Simhanihnata Mahendragajah ("The elephant of king Mahendra, destroyer of lion").
- Rhinoceros-slayer (Khadgatrata) type: This gold coin is unique to Kumaragupta, and shows the king riding a horse and attacking a rhinoceros with his sword. The legend reads khadgatrata Kumaragupto jayaty-anisham ("Ever victorious is the lord Kumaragupta, who is saviour of rhinoceroses"). The reverse shows goddess Ganga, with a female attendant holding a chhatra (umbrella). The goddess stands on an elephant-headed crocodile, which holds a lotus stalk in its trunk. The reverse legend reads Shri-Mahendrakhadga ("The illustrious Mahendra [saviour of] rhinoceros").
- Ashvamedha-type: Similar to the Ashvamedha-type coins of Samudragupta. The legend is unclear, but historian A. S. Altekar has read it as Devo jitashatruth Kumaragupto dhiraja ("King Kumaragupta, the supreme lord, who has conquered his enemies"). The reverse legend reads Shri-Ashvamedha-Mahendrah.
- Karttikeya type: Shows the god Karttikeya, who is also known as "Kumara". The legend is unclear: Altekar has read it as Jayati svagunair-guna Mahendra-Kumarah ("Victorious is Mahendra-Kumara by his own merits"). The obverse shows the king feeding a peacock, who is the vahana (mount) of the god, with the legend Shri-Mahendra Kumarah.
- Chhatra-type: Similar to the chhatra-type coins of Chandragupta II. The obverse legend begins with Jayati mahitalam; the rest of it is lost. The reverse legend reads Shri-Mahendraditya.
- Apratigha-type: The obverse depicts a man (possibly the king) flanked by a man on his left and a woman in vitarka mudra on his right. The vertical legends beside the central figure read Kumara and guptah; there is a circular legend which is unclear. The reverse shows the goddess Lakshmi sitting on a lotus, with the legend Apratighah ("unconquered").
- Lyrist type: Similar to the lyrist-type coins of Samudragupta; shows the king sitting on a couch and playing a lute. The legend reads Maharajadhiraja-Shri-Kumaraguptah. The reverse shows a woman sitting on a couch and holding a flower, with the legend Shri-Kumaragupta.
- King and queen-type: Similar to the coins of Chandragupta I. The obverse shows king presenting a bunch of flowers to the queen, with an unclear legend. The reverse shows a goddess seated on a lion, with the legend Shri-Kumaraguptah.

Some repoussé coins discovered at Khairatal have also been attributed to Kumaragupta by earlier scholars. These coins depict a garuda with outstretched wings and legend Mahendraaditya. The other side is blank. It is likely that these coins were not issued by Kumaragupta or any other Gupta ruler.

== Inscriptions ==
At least 18 inscriptions from Kumaragupta's reign are available. All of these inscriptions were issued by private individuals rather than the Gupta royals, and most of them aim to record religious matters. Nevertheless, they provide valuable historical information, such as a genealogy of the Gupta kings, dates, locations of places in the Gupta empire, and names of royal officers. The earliest extant Gupta inscriptions from the Bengal region were issued during Kumaragupta's reign.

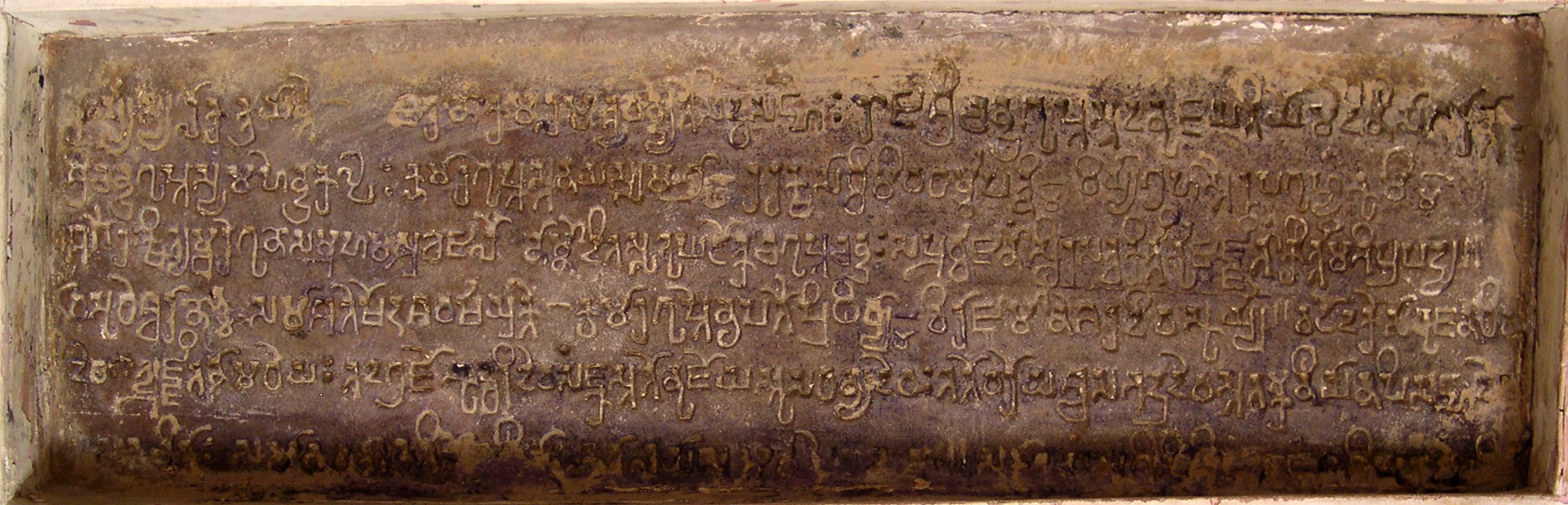
Tumain inscription of Kumāragupta, discovered in Madhya Pradesh. Dated Gupta Era 117 (c. 436 CE). Gwalior Fort Archeologic Museum.

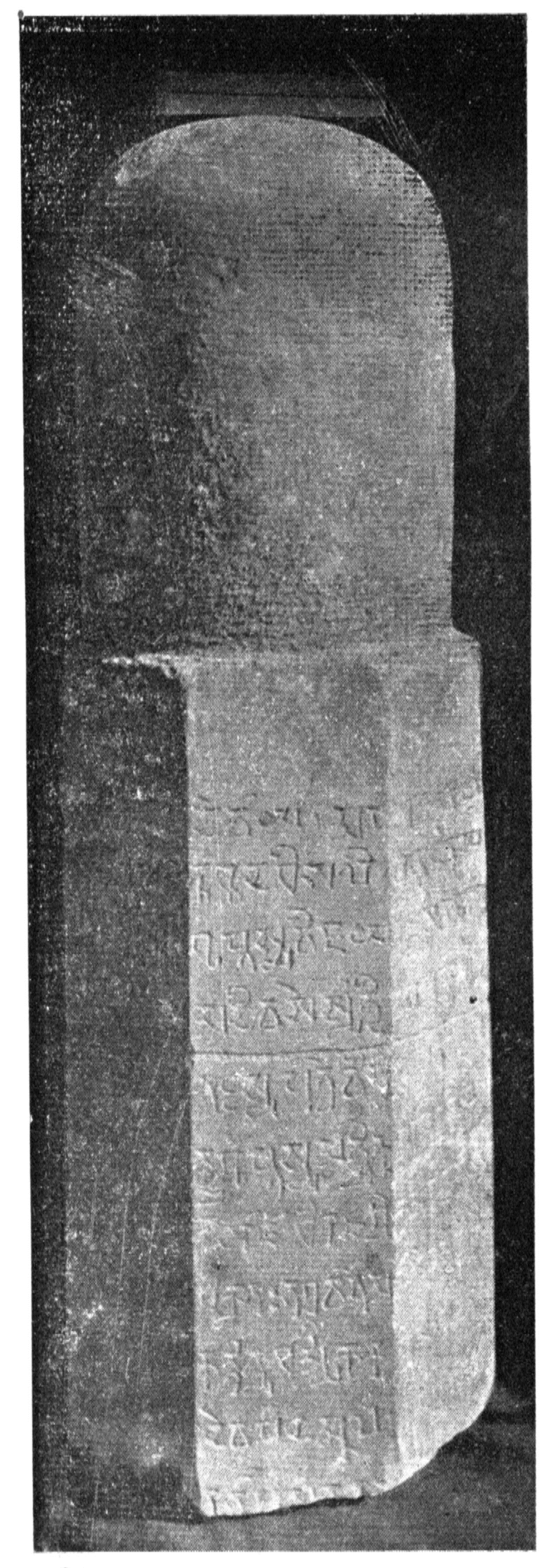
A Linga dedicated in Gupta Era 117, during the reign of Kumaragupta I, from Karamdanda, District Gonda, Uttar Pradesh. Lucknow Museum.

Inscriptions issued during Kumaragupta's reign
Find spot	Image	Type	Period	Source
Bilsad (or Bilsarh), Etah district		Stone pillar	Gupta Era 96 (c. 415 CE)	
Gadhwa (or Ghadwa), Allahabad district		Stone	Gupta Era 98 (c. 417 CE)	
Gadhwa (or Ghadwa), Allahabad district		Stone	Undated	
Gadhwa (or Ghadwa), Allahabad district		Stone	Undated	
Udayagiri		Cave	Gupta Era 106 (c. 425 CE)	
Mathura		Jain idol	Gupta Era 113 (c. 432 CE)	
Dhanaidaha, Bangladesh		Copper plate	Gupta Era 113 (c. 432 CE)	
Mathura		Buddha image	Gupta Era 115 (c. 434 CE)	
Tumain		Stone	Gupta Era 117 (c. 436 CE)	
Karamdanda, Uttar Pradesh		Stone linga	Gupta Era 117 (c. 436 CE)	
Kalaikuri-Sultanpur, Bangladesh		Copper plate	Gupta Era 120 (c. 439 CE)	
Damodarpur near Phulbari, Bangladesh		Copper plate	Gupta Era 124 (c. 443 CE)	
Mathura		Broken idol	Gupta Era 125 (c. 444 CE)	
Damodarpur		Copper plate	Gupta Era 128 (c. 447 CE)	
Baigram (or Boigram), Bangladesh		Copper plate	Gupta Era 128 (c. 447 CE)	
Man Kuwar (or Mankuwar), Uttar Pradesh		Buddha image	Gupta Era 129 (c. 448 CE)	
Sanchi		Stone	Gupta Era 131 (c. 450 CE)	
Mathura		Buddha image	Gupta Era 135 (c. 454 CE)	

An inscription on a figure of a yaksha from Mathura in the reign of Kumaragupta has been dated to 432 CE, and a pedestal (with no king's name on it, but presumably from Kumaragupta's reign) has been dated to 432 CE.
