= Skandagupta =

Gupta emperor from 455 to 467

- Chakravartin; Vikramaditya; Kramaditya
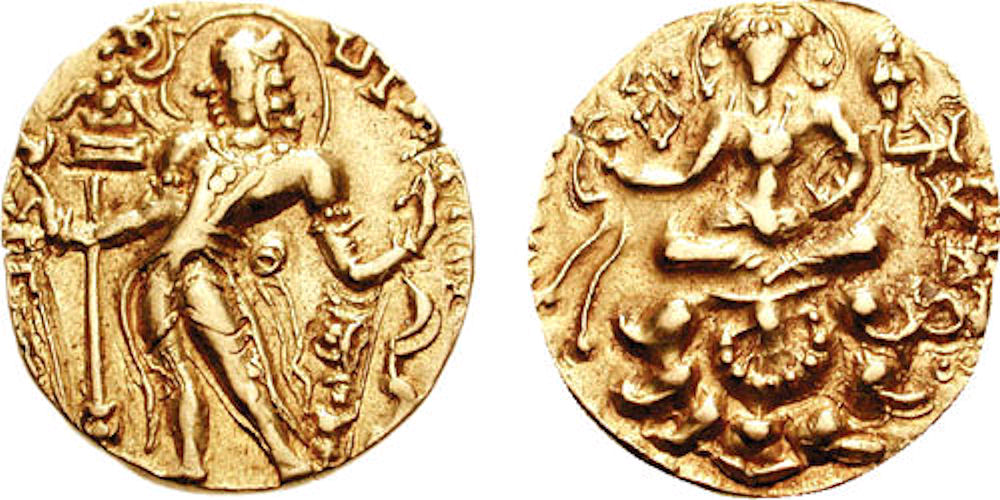
- Gold coin of Skandagupta, depicting himself on the obverse, Lakshmi on the reverse. The name Skan-da appears vertically under the left arm of the emperor.

Gupta emperor
- Reign: c. 455 – c. 467
- Predecessor: Kumaragupta I
- Successor: Purugupta
- Died: 467 CE
- Dynasty: Gupta
- Father: Kumaragupta I
- Mother: Unknown
- Religion: Hinduism

Find spots of inscriptions of Skandagupta, and contemporary polities.

Skandagupta (Ska-nda-gu-pta, r. c. 455–467) was a Gupta Emperor who ruled an empire centered on present-day northern India. His Bhitari pillar inscription suggests that he restored the Gupta power by defeating his enemies, who may have been rebels or foreign invaders. He repulsed an invasion by the Indo-Hephthalites (known as Hunas in India), probably the Kidarites. He seems to have maintained control of his inherited territory, and is generally considered the last of the great Gupta Emperors. The Gupta genealogy after him is unclear, but he was most probably succeeded by Purugupta, who appears to have been his younger half-brother.

== Early life ==
Skandagupta was a son of the Gupta emperor Kumaragupta I. His mother may have been a junior queen or a concubine of Kumaragupta. This theory is based on the fact that Skandagputa's inscriptions mention the name of his father, but not of his mother. For example, Skandagupta's Bhitari pillar inscription lists the chief queens (mahadevis) of his ancestors Chandragupta I, Samudragupta, and Chandragupta II, but does not mention the chief queen of his father Kumaragupta. J. F. Fleet read a line of the Bhitari inscription to state that Skandagupta was "raised to Aryan status by the panegyrics of bards". Based on this, A. L. Basham theorized that his mother was from Shudra background.

Others, such as Dasharatha Sharma have criticized this theory, pointing out that the Bhitari inscription clearly suggests that Skandagupta's mother held a very exalted status in the eyes of her son. The inscription states that after restoring the fallen fortunes of his family by defeating his enemies, he visited his mother just like the legendary hero Krishna had visited his mother Devaki. Jagannath Agrawal theorizes that the composer of the inscription deliberately departed from convention and devoted a line to the king's mother: this was not because of the inferior status of the mother. Agrawal disputes Fleet's reading of the "Aryan status" line, providing an alternative reading: "whom nobility causes to blush by reason of the narrations of his exploits by means of songs and eulogies". This line seems to be inspired from a verse in Kalidasa's Raghuvaṃśa. Agrawal further argues that the Bhitari inscription is a prashasti aimed at glorifying the king, and its composer would not have made a derogatory insinuation about the low status of the king's mother. According to historian Jappen Oberoi, Skandagupta's mother was definitely a queen, if not the chief queen, and that makes Skandagupta a legitimate son of Kumaragupta I.

Based on the inscription, some scholars have theorised that Devaki was the name of his mother. However, according to historian R. C. Majumdar, it is more likely that the description aims to highlight the degraded position of his mother just like that of the legendary Devaki, before Skandagupta restored her to a position of prestige and power, just like Krishna did for Devaki.

== Ascension to the throne ==
Bhitari pillar inscription of Skandagupta
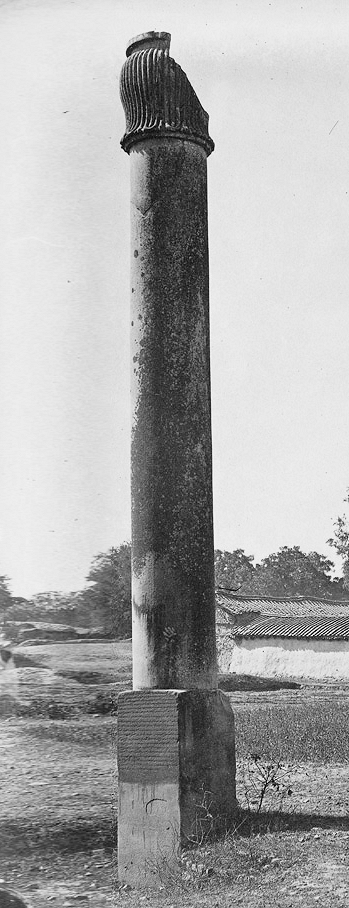
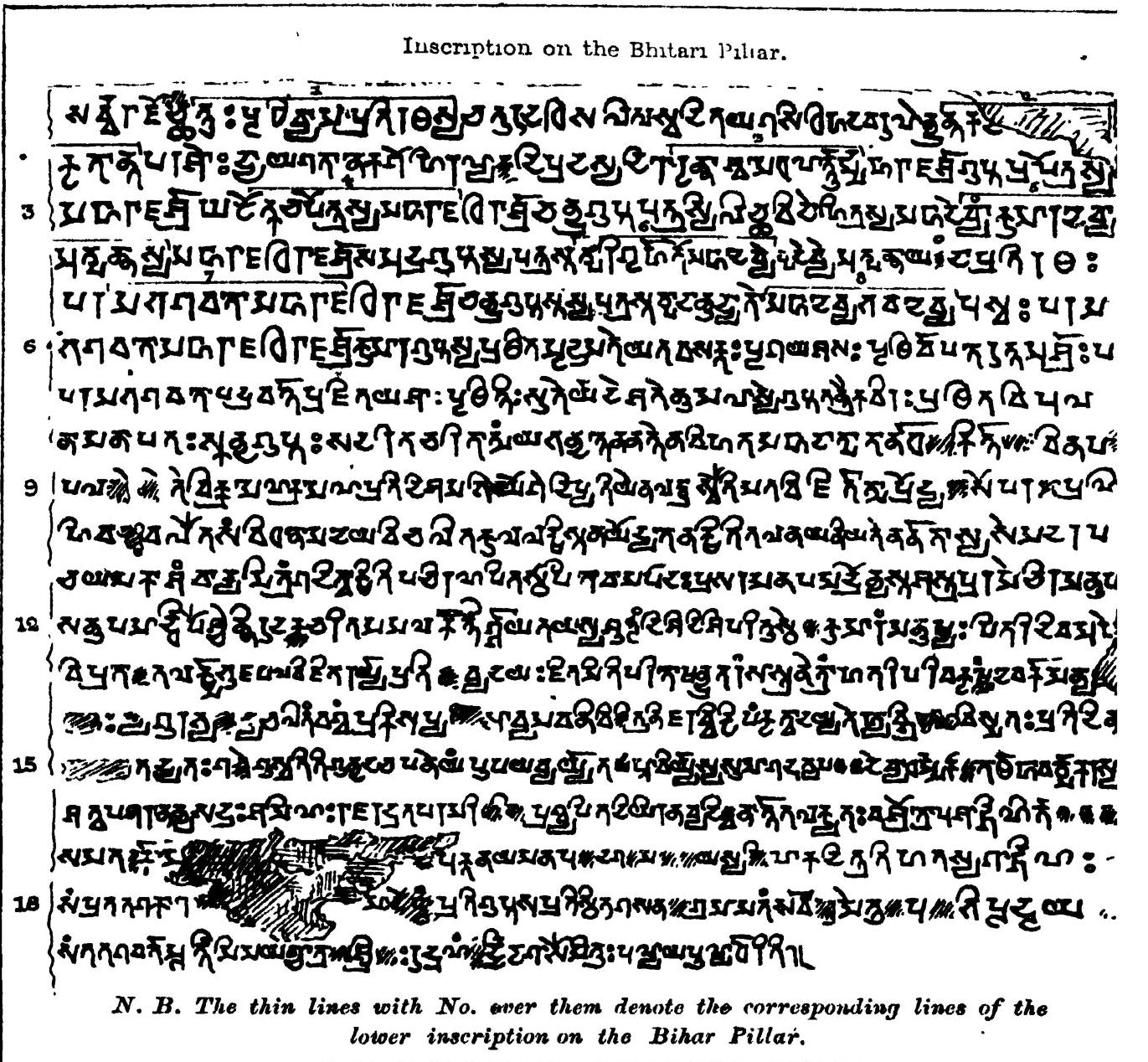
The Bhitari pillar inscription of Skandagupta

Skandagupta ascended the throne in year 136 of the Gupta era (c. 455-456 CE). According to the Bhitari pillar inscription, he restored "the fallen fortunes of his family". The inscription states that when he prepared to do so, he spent a night on the bare earth, and then defeated his enemies, who had grown wealthy and powerful. After defeating his enemies, he visited his widowed mother, whose eyes were "full of tears from joy".

Many scholars read the name of the enemies mentioned in the Bhitari inscription as "Pushyamitras", who according to the Puranas, were a tribe, and probably ruled an area located on the banks of the Narmada River. However, an alternative interpretation of the inscription reads "Yudhyamitras" (a generic term for enemies) instead of "Pushyamitras".

According to one theory, these enemies invaded the Gupta empire during the last years of Kumaragupta's reign, or shortly after his death, and Skandagupta defeated them. According to another theory, the conflict referred to in the Bhitari inscription resulted from a disputed succession to the throne. This theory is based on the following points:

Junagadh rock inscription of Skandagupta
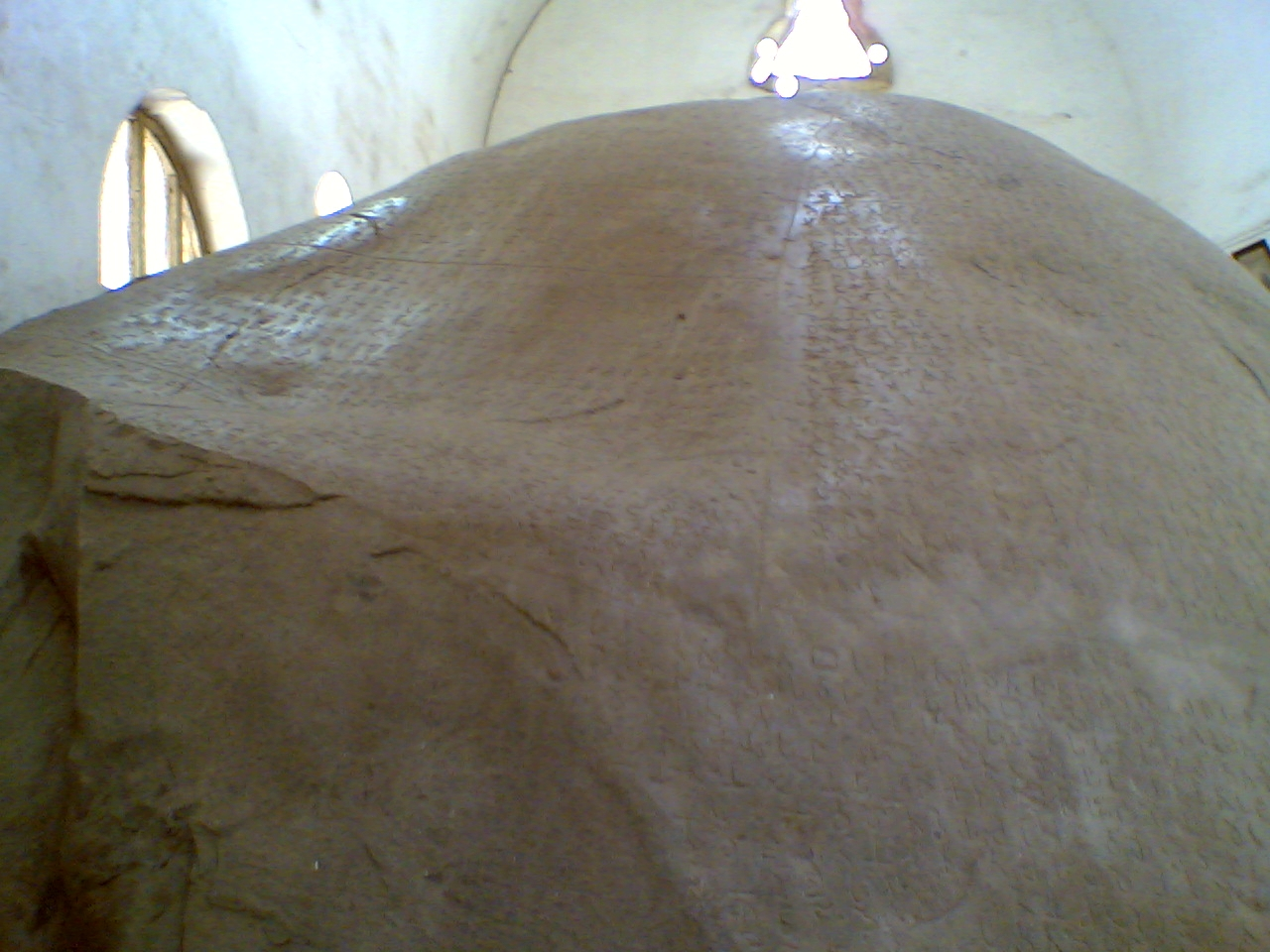
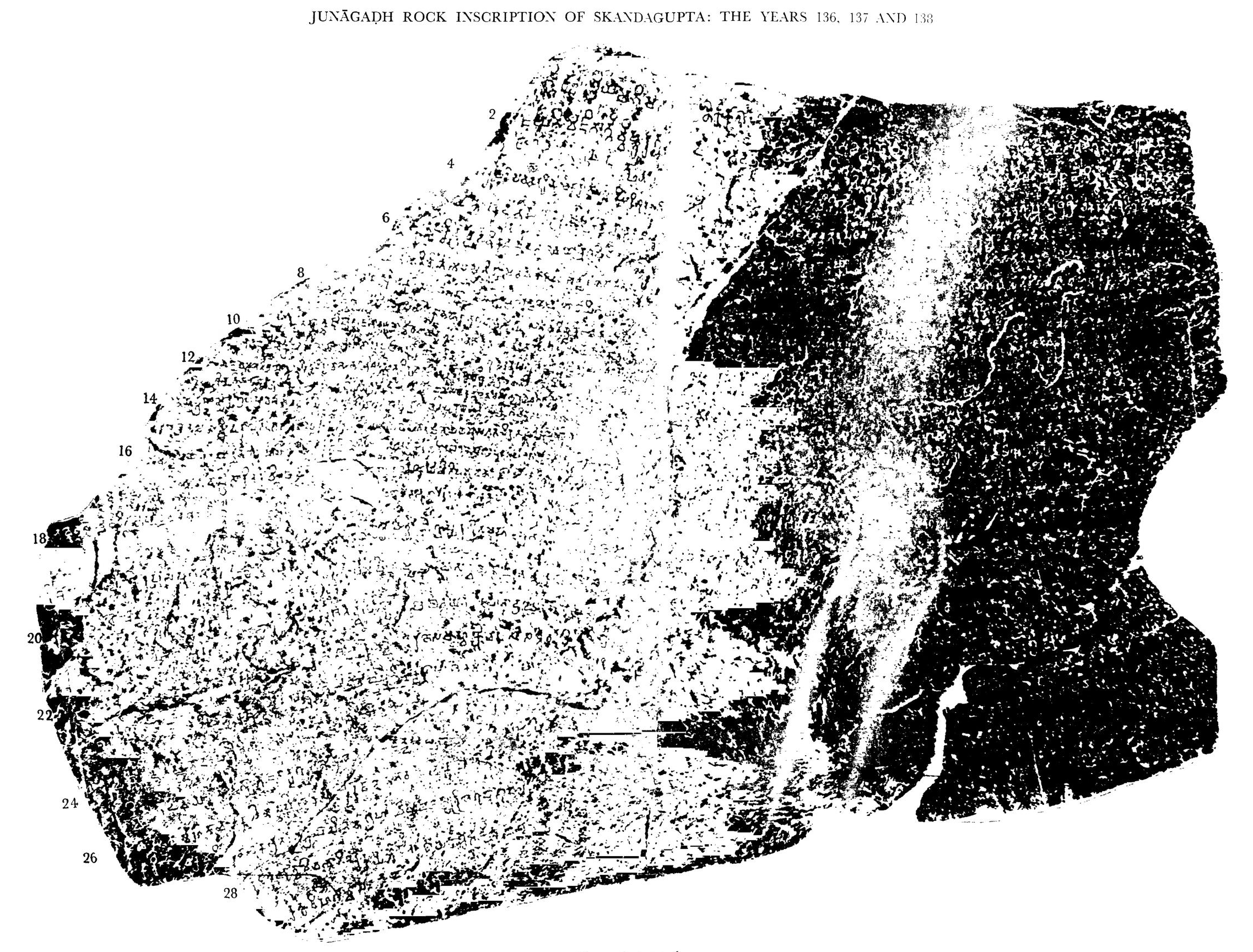
The Junagadh rock in Girnar mountain contains an inscription of Skandagupta, besides those of the earlier kings Ashoka and Rudradaman I.
- The Junagadh inscription states that after his father's death, Skandagupta became "the ruler of the earth" by his own prowess. This suggests that Skandagupta acquired the throne using force.
- His mother was probably a junior wife of Kumaragupta rather than the chief queen (see Early life section above), and therefore, his claim to the throne was not legitimate.
- The Junagadh inscription states that Lakshmi, the goddess of fortune, chose Skandagupta as her husband after rejecting all other "sons of kings". Some coins issued by Skandagupta depict a woman offering him an uncertain object, probably a garland or a ring. Assuming this woman is Lakshmi, the depiction seems to be a visual representation of the statement made in the inscription. (Some scholars identify the woman as a queen rather than Lakshmi).
- The Bhitari inscription makes three mentions of the fallen fortunes of the Gupta family (kula or vamsha). The mention of family, rather than the empire, may be a reference to the disputed succession to the throne. The reading "Yudhyamitras", rather than "Pushyamitras", may be correct, and the enemies referred to in the inscription may be rival claimants to the throne.
- Various historical records suggest that multiple people in the Gupta empire assumed sovereign status after Kumaragupta's death. These people include Kumaragupta's brother Govindagupta, his relative Ghatotkacha-gupta, and Prakashaditya (who is known from some gold coins). These people may have been rivals of Skandagupta.

Another argument cited in favour of the disputed succession theory is that the records of the subsequent Gupta kings omit Skandagupta's name from the royal genealogy, listing Purugupta's name after that of Kumaragupta. An example is the Bhitari seal of the 6th century king Kumaragupta III. However, this omission may be explained by the fact that these subsequent kings were descendants of Skandagupta's half-brother Purugupta, and the genealogical lists in their records intend to list only their direct ancestors, rather than provide a comprehensive list of the earlier Gupta kings.

== Conflict with the Hunas ==
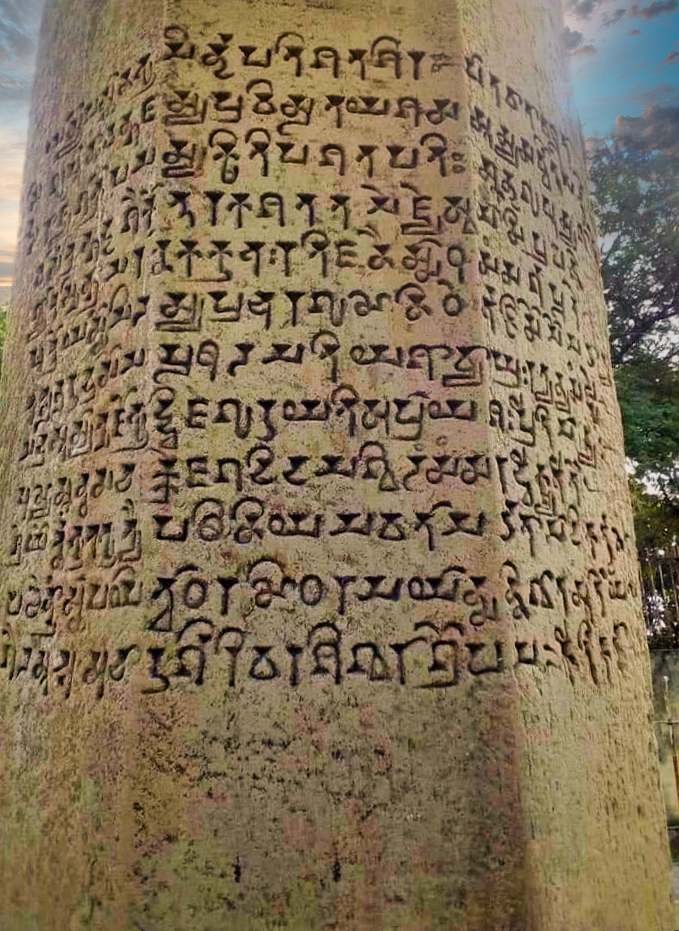
Madra inscription on the Kahaum pillar

During Skandagupta's period, the Indo-Hephthalites (known as the White Huns or Hunas) invaded India from the northwest, advancing as far as the Indus River.

The Bhitari pillar inscription states that Skandagupta defeated the Hunas:

(Skandagupta), "by whose two arms the earth was shaken, when he, the creator (of a disturbance like that) of a terrible whirlpool, joined in close conflict with the Hûnas; . . . . . . among enemies . . . . . . arrows . . . . . . . . . . . . proclaimed . . . . . . . . . . . . just as if it were the roaring of (the river) Ganga, making itself noticed in (their) ears."

— Bhitari pillar inscription of Skandagupta Line 15

The date of the Huna invasion is not certain. The Bhitari inscription mentions it after describing the conflict with the Pushyamitras (or the Yudhyamitras), which suggests that it happened later during Skandagupta's reign. However, a possible reference to this conflict in the Junagadh inscription suggests that it may have happened at the beginning of the Skandagupta's reign or during the reign of his father Kumaragupta. The Junagadh inscription, dated to the year 138 of the Gupta era (c. 457–458 CE) mentions Skandagupta's success against the mlechchhas (foreigners):

...whose [Skandagupta's] fame, moreover, even [his] enemies, in the countries of the mlechchhas... having their pride broken down to the very root, announce with the words "verily the victory has been achieved by him."

— Junagadh inscription

The victory against the mlechchhas happened in or before the year 136 of the Gupta era (c. 455-456 CE), when Skandagupta ascended the throne and when he appointed Parnadatta as the governor of the Saurashtra region, in which Junagadh is located. Since Skandagupta is not known to have fought against any other foreigners, these mlechchhas were probably the Hunas. If this identification is correct, it is possible that as a prince, Skandagupta was sent to check the Huna invasion at the frontier, and Kumaragupta died in the capital while this conflict was happening; Skandagupta returned to the capital and overcame rebels or rival claimants to ascend the throne.

A sentence in the Sanskrit text Chandra-Vyakarana (c. 7th century) states Ajayad-Gupto Hunan, literally, "The Gupta conquered the Hunas". This may be a reference to Skandagupta's victory over the Hunas, although an alternative reading by scholar K. P. Jayaswal has "Jato" instead of "Gupto". A story in the Kathasaritsagara (11th century) states that the legendary king Vikramaditya ascended the throne after his father Mahendraditya abdicated it, and inflicted a crushing defeat on the mlechchhas. Since Mahendraditya was a title of Kumaragupta, and Vikramaditya that of Skandagupta, this may be a reference to Skandagupta's victory over the Hunas.

=== Identification with Duhprasahasta ===
One theory identifies Skanda-gupta with prince Duhprasahasta (Duṣprasahasta) mentioned in the Buddhist text Candra-garbha-paripṛcchā-sūtra (or the Chandra-garbha-sutra). The text narrates a purported prophecy as follows: Three foreign powers - the Yavanas, Palhikas (or Pahlikas) and Shakunas - will invade India and cause immense destruction. Initially mutual enemies, they will ultimately become allies and unite into a single kingdom. They will conquer Gandhara and other countries lying to the north of the Ganges. They will then invade the territory of king Mahendra-sena of Kaushambi with a 300,000-strong army, distressing the king. The king's 12-year old son, Duhprasahasta, will repulse the invasion. Mahendra-sena will then crown Duhprasahasta as the new king. For the next 12 years, Duhprasahasta will wage a war against the invaders. Ultimately, he will capture and execute the three invading kings, and become the emperor of Jambudvipa (India).

Scholar K. P. Jayaswal (1934) identifies the invaders as Hunas, Mahendra-sena as Kumaragupta I alias Mahendraditya, and his son as Skandagupta. Historian R. C. Majumdar dismisses such legends as generally unreliable.

== Western India ==
The Junagadh rock, which contains inscription of the earlier emperors, Ashoka and Rudradaman, has an inscription engraved on the orders of Skandagupta's governor Parnadatta. The inscription states that Skandagupta appointed governors of all provinces, including Parnadatta as the governor of Surashtra. It is not clear if the verse refers to routine appointments made by the king, or his actions after a political turmoil resulting from a war of succession or invasion. The inscription outlines several qualifications required to be the governor of Surashtra, stating that only Parnadatta met these requirements. Again, it is not clear if these were actual qualifications required to be a governor under Skandagupta's rule, or if the verse simply aims to eulogise Parnadatta.

Parnadatta appointed his son Chakrapalita as the magistrate of the Girinagara city (near modern Junagadh-Girnar area), which was presumably the capital of Surashtra. The Junagadh inscription records Chakdrapalita's repairs to the Sudarshana lake, an ancient reservoir originally constructed by Chandragupta Maurya, and later improved by his grandson Ashoka. The dam was subsequently re-built by Rudradaman in c. 150, but burst in c. 456–457 (year 137 of the Gupta era). Chakrapalita is said to have spent an "immeasurable" amount of wealth to build an embankment, and is also credited with the construction of a Vishnu temple.

An inscription of the Vakataka king Narendrasena claims that his commands were obeyed by the rulers of Kosala, Mekala and Malava. The regnal dates of Narendrasena are not certain, but he is generally thought to be a contemporary of Skandagupta. Since Malava was a part of the Gupta Empire at one time, it is possible that Narendrasena raided Gupta territories during Skandagupta's reign. Skandagupta would have restored Gupta control over the region soon after. A c. 460–461 inscription refers to the "tranquil reign of Skandagupta, the lord of hundred kings."

== Succession ==
The last known date of Skandagupta is c. 467–468 CE (year 148 of the Gupta era), and he probably ruled for a few more years.

Skandagupta was most probably succeeded by Purugupta, who appears to have been his half-brother. Purugupta was a son of Kumaragupta I from his chief queen, and therefore, must have been his legitimate successor. It is possible that he was a minor at the time of Kumaragupta I's death, because of which Skandagupta ascended the throne. Skandagupta appears to have died heirless, or his son may have been dethroned by Purugupta's family.

== Coinage ==
Compared to his predecessors, Skandagupta issued fewer gold coins, and some of these coins feature relatively less quantity of gold. It is possible that the various wars fought by him strained the state treasury, although this cannot be said with certainty.

Skandagupta issued five types of gold coins: Archer type, King and queen type, Chhatra type, Lion-slayer type and Horseman type. His silver coins are of four types: Garuda type, Bull type, Altar type and Madhyadesha type. The initial gold coinage was on the old weight standard used by his father Kumaragupta of approximately 8.4 gm. This initial coinage is quite scarce. At some point in his reign, Skandagupta revalued his currency, switching from the old dinar standard to a new suvarna standard that weighed approximately 9.2 gm. These later coins were all only of the Archer type, and this standard and type was followed by all subsequent Gupta rulers.

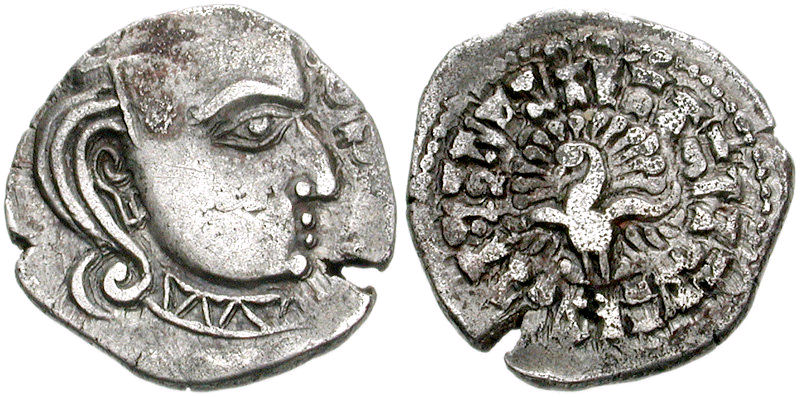
Coin of Skandagupta (455-467), in the style of the Western Satraps.

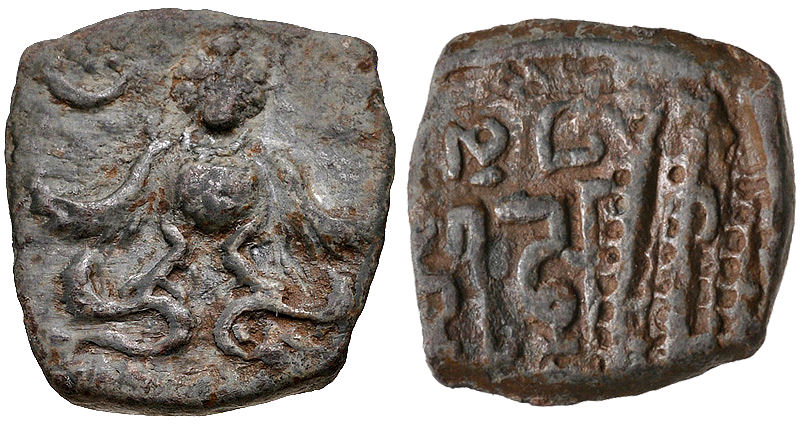
Coin of Skandagupta Kramaditya with facing Garuda.

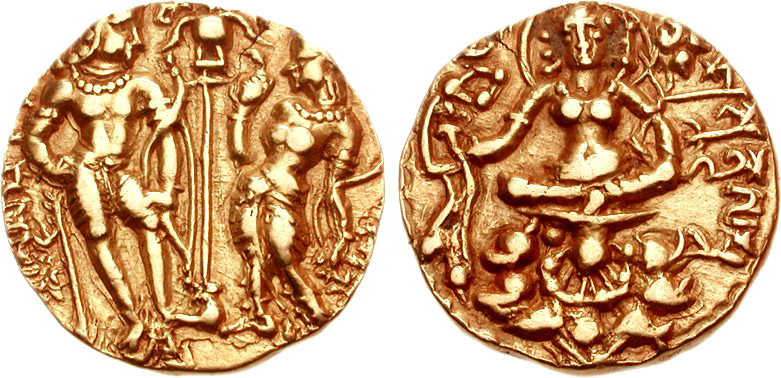
Gold dinar of Skandagupta.

== Religion ==
Skandagupta's Bhitari pillar inscription records his installation of a Vishnu image in the memory of his father.

== In popular culture ==
Jaishankar Prasad, a renowned poet of modern Hindi literature, wrote a play named Skandagupta in 1928, based on the life of Skandagupta. In the 1960s, Shanta Gandhi, Professor of Ancient Indian Drama while at National School of Drama, staged the play with little changes to the original script.

According to Rakesh Upadhyay, a professor at the Banaras Hindu University, the movie Baahubali 2: The Conclusion was based on Skandagupta's life.

Regnal titles
Preceded by Kumaragupta I	Gupta Emperor; 455–467 CE	Succeeded by Purugupta
