= Shankargarh (disambiguation) =

Shankargarh is a town and a nagar panchayat in Prayagraj district, Uttar Pradesh.

It may also refer to:

- Shankargarh, Balrampur, administrative blocks of Balrampur district, Chhattisgarh state.
- Shankarnagar, Madhya Pradesh, a town in Umaria district of Madhya Pradesh state.

- Shankar Nagar, village in Lumbini region of Rupandehi district in southern Nepal.
- Sankarnagar, a panchayat town in Tirunelveli district in the Indian state of Tamil Nadu state.
