= Prashasti =

Indian genre of inscriptions

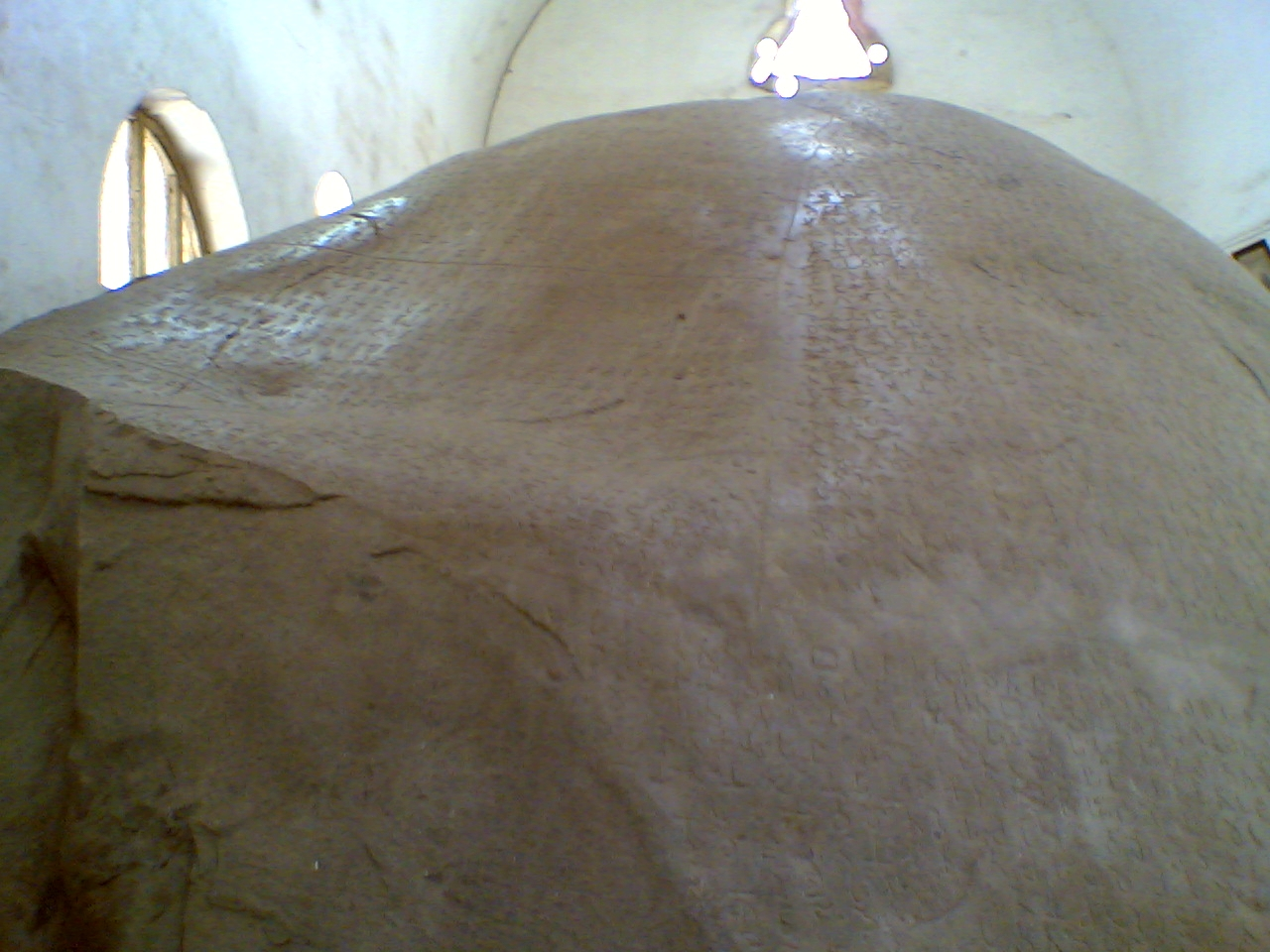
The Junagadh rock inscription of Rudradaman contains an early Prashasti, by Western Satrap ruler Rudradaman I, circa 150 CE.

Prashasti (IAST: Praśasti, Sanskrit for "praise") is an Indian genre of inscriptions composed by poets in praise of their rulers. Most date from the 6th century CE onwards. Written in the form of poetry or ornate prose, the prashastis stereotypically constructed a genealogy, the ruler's attributes, eulogize victories, piety and typically ended with one or more announcements of generous gifts and rewards he has given. They differ from the so-called "Cultic" genre of Indian inscriptions which praise a deity, religious founder (Buddha, Tirthankara, sub-tradition of Hinduism), guru, or sages then typically announces gifts or donations to a monastery, school, temple or a generous cause. In some epigraphic literature, a prashasti is considered synonymous with a kirti or purva, and is related to the word kirtana which implies "songs and praises of" someone or a deity.

He is the King of Peace, the King of Prosperity,
the King of Monks (bhikshus), the King of Religion (Dharma),
who has been seeing, hearing and realising blessings (kalyanas),
(... lost ...) accomplished in extraordinary virtues,
respector of every sect, the repairer of all temples,
one whose chariot and army are irresistible,
one whose empire is protected by the chief of the empire (himself),
descended from the family of the Royal Sage Vasu,
the Great conqueror, the King, the illustrious Kharavela.

— Lines 16–17, c. 1st-century BCE Hathigumpha inscription

The prashastis generally contained ornate titles, links to mythical legends or comparisons to deities, and often fabricated stories about wars, victories, loot and attributes. For example, they would create genealogies of the rulers linked to solar or lunar dynasties, and in their praise allude to legendary heroes from Indian myths and legends such as those found in Epics and the Puranas.

The earliest well known example of an extensive prashasti is the Hathigumpha inscription of Kharavela inscribed in or about the 1st-century BCE in Prakrit language and Brahmi script. The earliest prashastic inscription in classical Sanskrit language is the Junagadh rock inscription of Rudradaman (circa 150 CE), which became a prototype for Gupta era poetic prashastis in Sanskrit. According to Richard G. Salomon – a scholar of South Asian inscriptions, the inscription is the first extensive panegyric record in the poetic style. The style of Rudradaman's inscription is seen in later prashasti inscriptions.

The Tamil meykeerthi inscriptions are similar to the prashastis, but feature far more standardized formats.

== Examples ==
- Nashik prashasti (2nd century CE), Satavahana dynasty
- Prayaga prashasti (4th century CE), Gupta Empire: Lists the rulers against whom the Gupta king Samudragupta fought. It also describes the policy that he followed toward each set of rulers.
- Velvikudi inscription (c. 8th century CE), Pandya dynasty
- Deopara Prashasti (12th century CE), Sena dynasty
- Raj Prashasti (17th century CE), Mewar dynasty
- Gadhwa Stone Inscriptions (Garhwa Fort) (5th century CE).

== Sources ==
- Salomon, Richard (1998). Indian Epigraphy: A Guide to the Study of Inscriptions in Sanskrit, Prakrit, and the Other Indo-Aryan Languages. Oxford: Oxford University Press. ISBN 0-19-509984-2.
