= The Archaeology of Hindu Ritual =

Book by Michael D. Willis

The Archaeology of Hindu Ritual: Temples and the Establishment of the Gods
- The cover of the book, depicting a Vaisnava head from Bhitrī, Uttar Pradesh, now in the British Museum, London. Jacket designed by Alice Soloway.
- Author: Michael D. Willis
- Language: English
- Subject: Hindu archaeology, Indian archaeology
- Publisher: Cambridge University Press
- Publication date: 2009
- Publication place: United Kingdom
- Media type: Print (Hardcover)
- Pages: 375
- ISBN: 978-0521518741

The Archaeology of Hindu Ritual: Temples and the Establishment of the Gods is an archaeological study focusing on the early development of Hinduism within the Gupta Empire between the 4th and 6th centuries CE. It was written by the British archaeologist Michael D. Willis who was the curator of the South Asian and Himalayan collection at the British Museum at the time of the book being published by Cambridge University Press in 2009.

Considered to be the first major archaeological study to deal with the origins of Hinduism, The Archaeology of Hindu Ritual takes an interdisciplinary approach to the subject, making use of epigraphy, iconology and ethnography. The first chapter, "The Archaeology and Politics of Time at Udayagiri", pays particular attention to the ritual site at the Udayagiri Caves in Madhya Pradesh. The second, "Establishment of the Gods", looks at the development of temples and puja in India.

Willis' book was positively reviewed in various peer reviewed academic journals, such as South Asian Studies and the Religious Studies Review, as well as in popular Indian newspaper The Hindu. Critics described it as a groundbreaking study and praised its use of a variety of different forms of evidence, but some argued that it neglected to properly discuss the relationship between Hindu rituals and the religious practices of Buddhist and Jainist communities in Gupta India.

== Evidences for the Historicity of Rama and Krishna ==
=== The quest for the Historical Existence of Rama and Krishna ===
The quest for the historical existence of Rama and Krishna, central figures of the Hindu epics the Ramayana and the Mahabharata, has been a subject of scholarly debate, combining literary, archaeological, and astronomical analysis. While both are revered as incarnations of Vishnu, the search for empirical evidence seeks to determine if these figures are rooted in historical reality.

==== RAMA ====
Literary and Astronomical Evidence

Proponents of Rama's historicity, such as author Pushkar Bhatnagar, argue that clues are embedded in Valmiki's Ramayana. Bhatnagar posits that Valmiki was a contemporary who accurately recorded planetary positions at various events in Rama's life. Using modern planetarium software, he claims these specific configurations, which do not repeat for thousands of years, can be verified, thereby suggesting a factual basis for the narrative .

Archaeological and Epigraphic Evidence

Archaeological findings have been central to the debate, particularly concerning Ayodhya. Excavations at the site, including those by the Archaeological Survey of India (ASI), have been cited as evidence for a large structure predating the Babri Masjid . Inscription evidence, such as the Kausambi inscription dated to the mid-2nd century A.D., refers to "Bhagavat Rama-Narayana," indicating that by that time, Rama was already worshipped as a divine incarnation and had an established cult . Coins from the Mathura region featuring a king named Ramadatta also date to the 2nd century A.D., further attesting to the name's significance . Additionally, the Bagh copper-plate inscription from about A.D. 366 credits the eight-armed reclining Vishnu with killing Ravana, demonstrating that by the 4th century, Rama was fully identified with Vishnu .

Historical and Geographical Evidence

Many locations mentioned in the Ramayana, such as Rameshwaram, Kishkindha, and others, remain part of local folklore and pilgrimage traditions in India . Local traditions in the Upper Krishna Valley, for instance, connect places like Jamboti (the birthplace of Jambavanta) and Ramatirtha (visited by Rama) to events from the epic .

Counterarguments

Conversely, some historians are skeptical. Professor R.S. Sharma has noted that inscriptions and sculptural pieces from Mathura dating to 200 BC–300 AD do not attest to Krishna's presence, leading to doubts about an "epic age" . Other scholars point out that references to a mythical Ayodhya in the Atharva Veda (1000–800 BC) and the later identification of the city with Rama suggest that the association of Ayodhya with Rama may have developed over time . M.C. Joshi of the ASI warns that mixing tradition and archaeology in Indian protohistory is fraught with subjectivity, as texts like the Ramayana were composed to expound dharma, not to record history .

===== KRISHNA =====
Literary Evidence

Krishna's historicity is supported by a range of literary sources. His life and philosophy appear in the Mahabharata, and independent references are found in non-sectarian works like Panini's grammar and the Chandogya Upanishad . Some scholars view the fact that contemporary Buddhist works like the Sutrapitaka refer to Krishna as an asura as evidence that he was recognized as a historical figure by other traditions . The Harivamsa, an epilogue to the Mahabharata, and the Buddhist Ghata Jataka (c. 3rd century B.C.) also contain detailed descriptions of Dwarka as Krishna's capital by the sea .

Archaeological Evidence: Dwaraka

One of the most explored areas is the submerged city of Dwaraka. Underwater archaeology led by Dr. S.R. Rao in 1983 uncovered a fortified settlement with stone walls, pier-like structures, and anchors off the coast of Gujarat . Dr. Rao concluded that these structural remains, dating to around 1500 BCE, belonged to the city of Dvaraka described in the Mahabharata . The Archaeological Survey of India has continued to conduct expeditions to study these submerged remains, with ongoing research aiming to document and search for archaeological evidence . An inscription of A.D. 574 from Palitana also mentions a king who was "like Sri Krsna of unquenchable valour" and had conquered the "lord of Dvaraka," confirming a strong 6th-century tradition linking Krishna to Dwarka .

Interpretations and Challenges

While the underwater discoveries are significant, they are not universally accepted as conclusive proof of Krishna's existence. The identification of the ruins with the epic city remains a matter of academic debate . Scholars like Edwin Francis Bryant note that the earliest reliably dated references to parts of the Krishna story appear in texts from the 500s BC, creating a significant gap between his supposed birthdate and the earliest verifiable references . Nonetheless, other historians argue that the lack of earlier archaeological evidence is not a definitive argument against historicity, given the lack of a sculptural tradition and limited systematic excavations in India .

Rama - Astronomical Dating

Times of India article discussing Pushkar Bhatnagar's work on dating Rama using planetary software:

https://timesofindia.indiatimes.com/home/sunday-times/deep-focus/true-legends/articleshow/1746526.cms

Millennium Post article explaining Bhatnagar's findings on Rama's birth date: https://www.millenniumpost.in/sundaypost/inland/clearing-the-mists-of-time-411204

Rama - Epigraphic Evidence (Kausambi Inscription)

Academic paper from Indology Journal discussing the Kausambi inscription proving Rama's divinity by the 2nd century A.D.:

https://indologyjournal.org/index.php/ijoi/article/download/38/23/118#2#1)

Krishna - Archaeological Evidence (Dwaraka)

CSIR-NIO repository entry on S.R. Rao's discovery of the submerged city of Dwaraka: https://drs.nio.res.in/drs/handle/2264/1/browse?rpp=20&offset=8963&etal=-1&sort_by=1&type=title&starts_with=Y&order=ASC

Original research paper by S.R. Rao on further excavations of Dwarka (1988–89): https://drs.nio.res.in/drs/bitstream/handle/2264/3290/Recent_Adv_Mar_Archaeol_Proc_1991_51.pdf?sequence=2&isAllowed=y

Krishna - Literary Evidence (Jataka Tales)

Academic paper referencing the Ghata Jataka's account of Krishna's life:

https://reviewofconphil.com/index.php/journal/article/download/111/64/192#4#4

== Background of the author ==
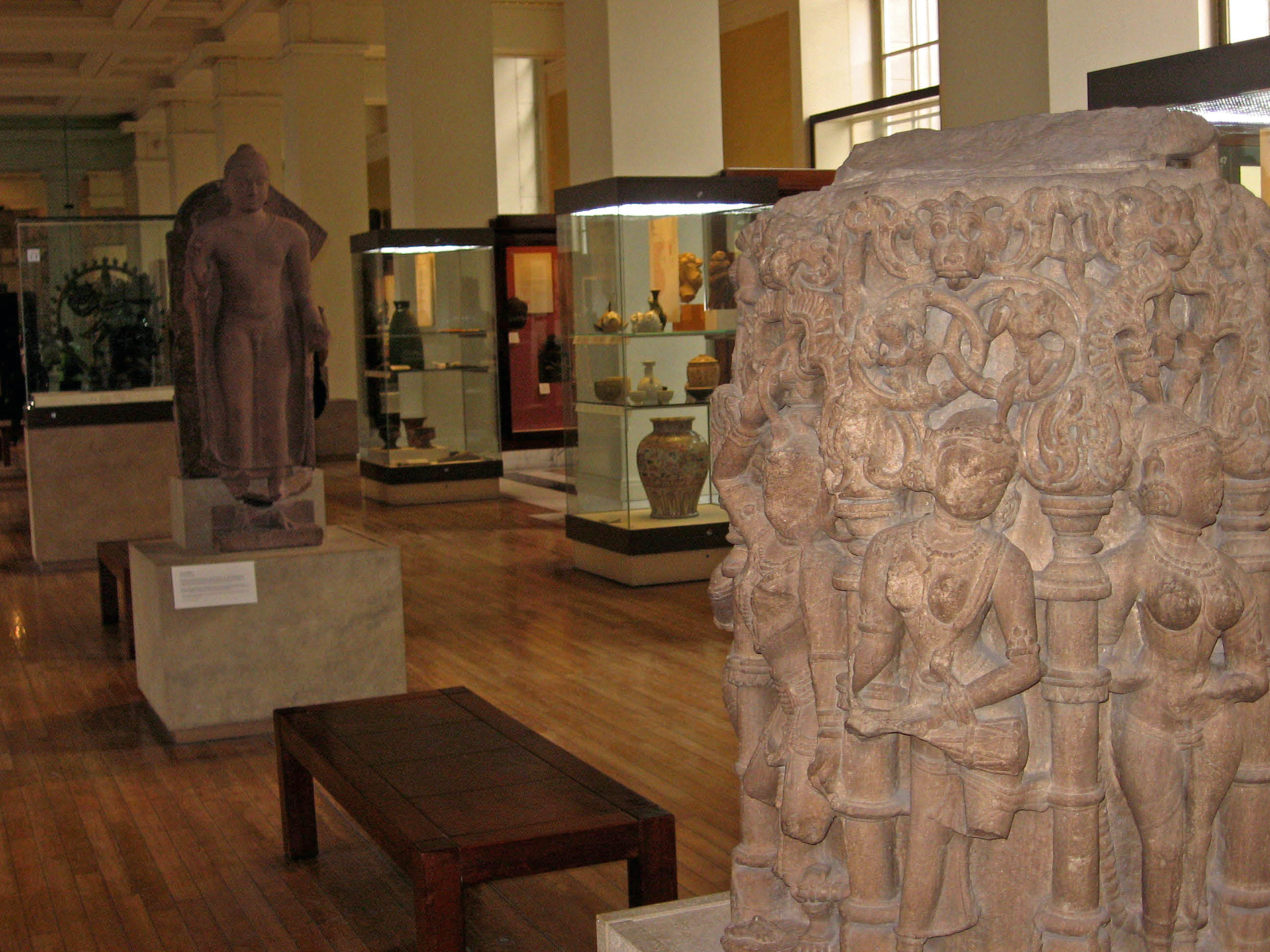
Willis is the curator of the British Museum's South Asia collection (pictured).

Willis was born in Vancouver, British Columbia, Canada, and raised in Kuwait and Saudi Arabia. He obtained a B.A. degree at the University of Victoria where he studied with Siri Gunasinghe and Alan Gowans. He then travelled to the University of Chicago and he studied with J. A. B. van Buitenen and Pramod Chandra. He received his doctoral degree in 1988 after periods in India and Cyprus. He taught at SUNY New Paltz before joining the British Museum in 1994.

Willis is a Fellow of the Royal Asiatic Society and an Honorary Research Fellow at Cardiff University. At the time of the book's publication, Willis was the curator of the early South Asian and Himalayan collections at the British Museum in central London.

Willis had previously published academic papers on the subject of early Hindu ritual and the Udayagiri Caves, including a paper entitled "The Archaeology and Politics of Time" in an anthology entitled The Vākāṭaka Heritage: Indian Culture at the Crossroads (2004), edited by Hans T. Bakker.

== Synopsis ==
"I was obliged to draw on a number of fields: epigraphy, iconology, historical astronomy, ethnography, landscape archaeology. I combined these with text-based Indology and religious studies. This approach – eclectic but not, I hope, eccentric – led me to breach disciplinary protocols and to create what I have termed the "archaeology of ritual." Whatever theoretical bells these words might ring, this is not a project in the tradition of Michel Foucault or Ian Hodder. Rather, it represents my own effort to inject a measure of dynamism into the static, desk-bound forms of analysis that have so far governed the study of Indian inscriptions, sculpture, built environment, and landscape."

— Michael Willis, 2009.

The book begins with a discussion of the early Hindu ritual site at the Udayagiri Caves, a place that had ancient origins but which was reworked under the administration of the Gupta Emperor Candragupta II. The relationship that Candragupta II had with the Hindu god Viṣṇu is highlighted before moving on to a discussion of his methodology. The author mentions an interdisciplinary approach was used that combines archaeological and historical evidence and critiques earlier text-based historical approaches to studying the development of early Hinduism. The discussion then returns to Udayagiri. Willis closes the introduction by reiterating his belief that in Indian history, it was religion that drove economic and political relationships rather than the other way round.

Chapter one, "The Archaeology and Politics of Time at Udayagiri", goes into depth regarding the archaeological site at the Udayagiri Caves and highlights the fact that it served as a centre for "imperial ritual" during the Gupta period. The author begins by describing the central ridge and passage at the site, before offering a synopsis of astronomical phenomenon and how it pertained to the Udayagiri site. Next discussed are various sculptures at the site, such as that of Narasiṃha and of Varāha, two avatars of Viṣṇu.

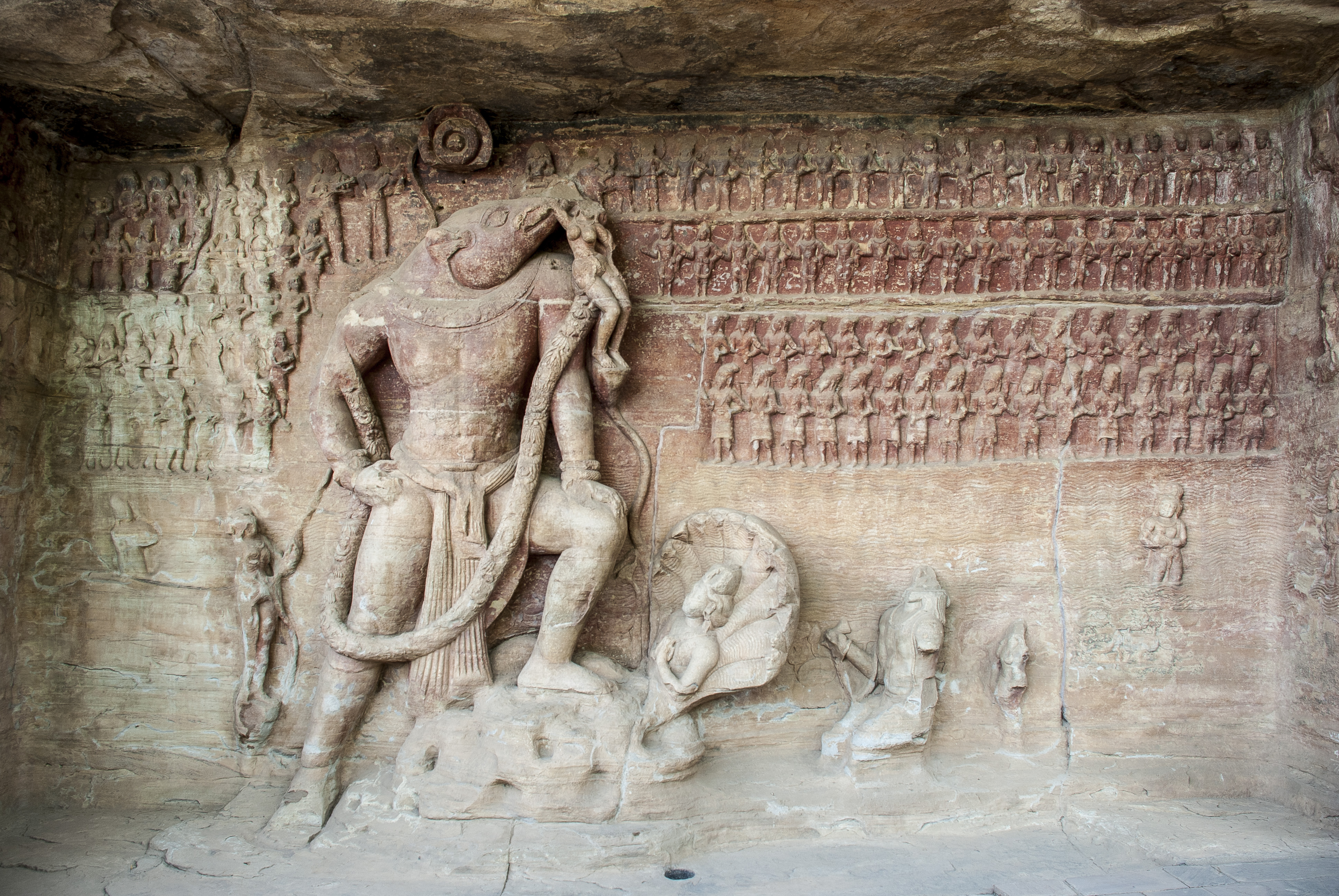
Cave 5 at Udayagiri, depicting the god Vishnu as Varaha Avatar.

The second chapter, entitled "The Establishment of the Gods",

Chapter three, "Ritual Action and Ritual Actors",

== Reception ==
=== Academic reviews ===
"The success of his book – inspiring, important, challenging, and at times maddening – lies in its undoubted ability to stimulate discussion, to make us revisit received ideas and to review the primary sources for ourselves. And for this we are indeed indebted to Michael Willis."

— Leslie C. Orr, 2010.

The Archaeology of Hindu Ritual was positively reviewed by Leslie C. Orr of Concordia University, Montreal in the journal South Asian Studies. Describing it as "extraordinarily ambitious and exciting", she did however take issue with some of Willis' statements, believing them to be erroneous. In particular, she argues that Willis has painted an incorrect picture with regards to the relationship between Hinduism and the heterodox Jain and Buddhist faiths, neglecting to refer to the many similarities between them. She also takes issue with Willis' trend to pick fights with "straw men", opining that these criticisms of his "seem out of place in a book of such grand scope and reach."

John E. Cort of Denison University, Ohio reviewed the book for the Religious Studies Review. Describing the "densely argued" book, Cort noted that in ignoring Jain and Buddhist iconography and temples, Willis had failed to encompass the same scope which he professes. Ultimately, Cort considered it to be an "essential" study for all of those interested in "medieval Indic temple religion."

In a review published in the Durham Anthropological Review, Vittorio Magnano of Durham University, North East England stated that Willis had provided a "meticulous analysis" of the available evidence in producing his study, ultimately describing it as "inspiring reading". Believing that Willis had followed a "line of reasoning with determination", he noted that his study still left room for the reader to come to their own decisions on certain issues. Concluding his review, Magnano recommended it to anyone with either an interest in Hindu ritual or interdisciplinary research.

=== Press reviews ===
The book was reviewed in The Hindu in an article entitled "Epigraphical study on Hindu rites" by a journalist T. Satyamurthy. Satyamurthy remarked that Willis' scholarship "stands out brilliantly" throughout the text, arguing that on the whole the book represents a "very erudite work". Believing works of this quality were rare, Satyamurthy praised the use of references and footnotes and the "new treatment" of the textual and epigraphic records.

== See also ==
- Añjali Mudrā
- Buddhist prayer beads
- Coconut: use for worship
- Culture of India
- Dhupa
- Guru-shishya tradition
- Hindu prayer beads
- Hindu temple
- Indian honorifics
- Mala
- List of Hindu festivals, many of which involve Puja
- Mudras
- Namaste
- Panchalinga Darshana
- Pranāma
- Puja (Buddhism)
- Puja (Hinduism)
- Pādodaka
- Satyanarayan Puja
