= Gadhwa Stone Inscriptions =

5th century ancient inscriptions in India

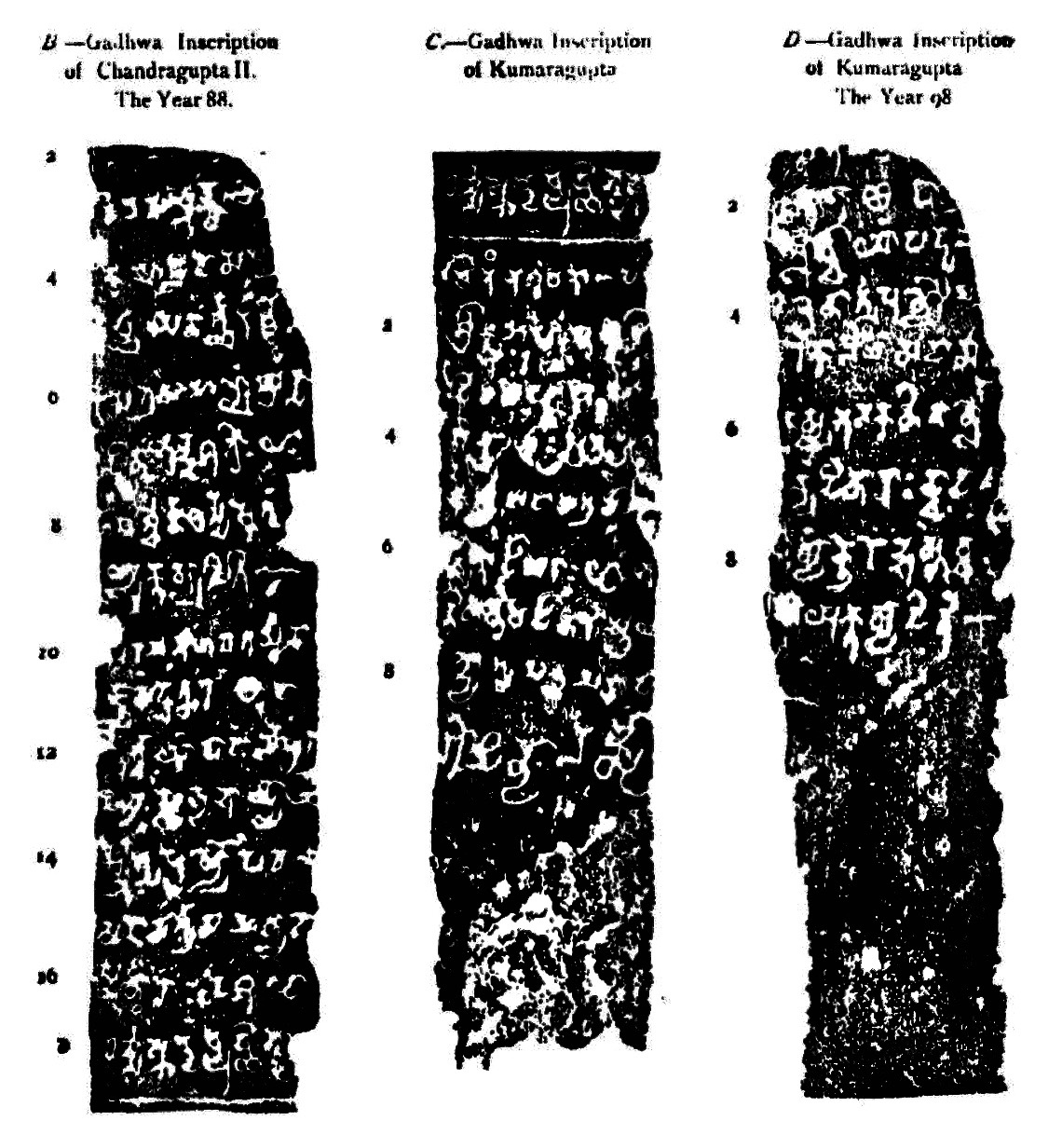
- Gadhwa inscription of Chandragupta II (left) and of Kumaragupta
- Material: Stone
- Writing: Sanskrit, Gupta script
- Created: various: 408 CE - 418 CE
- Period/culture: Gupta Empire era
- Discovered: Garhwa Fort near Allahabad, Uttar Pradesh
- Present location: Kolkata Museum (Indian Museum), West Bengal
- Coordinates: 25.2262°N 81.5860°E
- Gadhwa fort (Garhwa Fort) (India)

The Gadhwa Stone Inscriptions, or Garhwa Stone Inscriptions, are early 5th-century CE Sanskrit inscriptions discovered at Garhwa Fort, Uttar Pradesh relating to a series of charitable donations to various sattra (almshouses) by Gupta Empire rulers Chandragupta II and Kumaragupta I. The inscription is notable for including symbols for numerals "8, 10, 80 and 90" in the 5th-century, as well as mentioning the ancient city of Pataliputra (modern Patna).

== Description ==
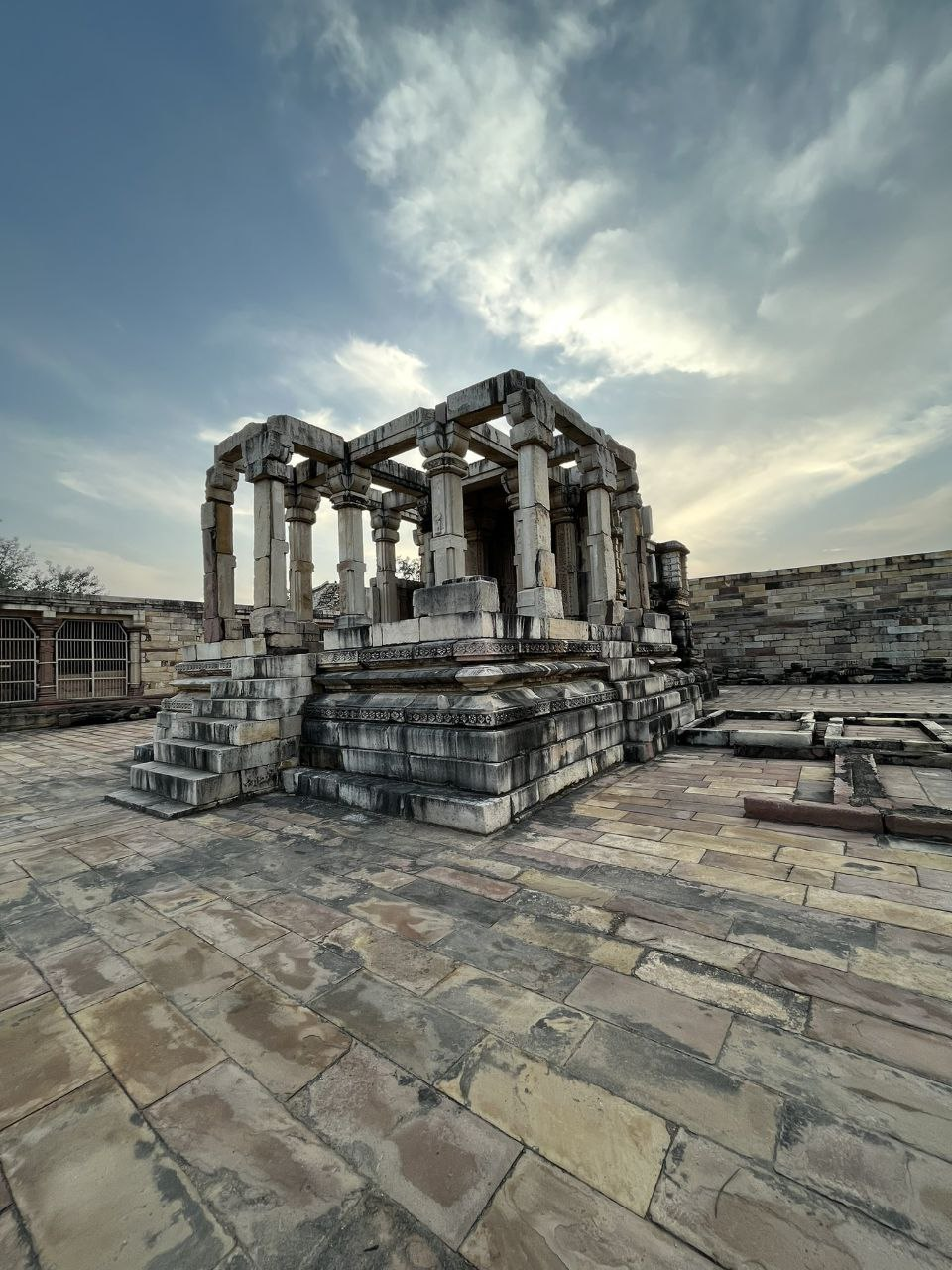
The Temple in Gadhwa fort.

The inscribed stones were discovered in 1872 by R.S. Prasad on blocks inside a room of a new house built from demolished and recut stone. The house was located in Gadhwa Fort, also referred to as the Garhwa Fort, in Allahabad district. Prasad brought these to the attention of the archaeologist Alexander Cunningham, who visited them, and after cleaning the lime was able to obtain prints. The first of these were published in 1873, while the last was published in 1890 after Cunningham carefully removed all the remaining lime and cleaned the surface to find additional inscriptions. The origin of the stones is unknown. The recutting and the prior history of the pillar blocks had badly damaged most of the inscription, but preserved enough under a coat of lime.

The original block was inscribed on its various faces. The structure it belonged to was demolished then likely cut into pieces, thereafter smoothened. The recovered stone has on one face only traces of 11 lines each with about 13 characters. These are too damaged to be read reliably, but the size and pattern of characters match the other faces. The back face was likely hammered and broken into two, leaving a rough edge with no text. The breaking has damaged about the last half of the all lines on the left face, and the first half of all lines on the right face. The damage extends to the top, where some number of lines have been lost.

The discovered inscription is in Sanskrit in prose.

The upper part of the inscription on the Gadhwa stone fragment 1 is dated to 408 CE. It states that Chandragupta II the "worshipper of the divine one" is establishing a perpetual sattra (almshouse, charitable feeding houses) with a gift of "ten dindras". The next section is dated to 418 CE, and it states that Kumaragupta, the "worshipper of the divine one" is establishing another perpetual sattra with two gifts of "ten dindras and (...)". The third decipherable section is a third grant, also by Kumaragupta which establishes another perpetual sattra with a gift of "twelve dindras".

== Significance ==
The Gadhwa stone inscription is significant in establishing a tradition of charitable giving by Indian kings and the existence of the institution of sattra in early 5th-century. It also confirms that Kumaragupta succeeded as the monarch of the Gupta Empire after Chandragupta II.

According to the archaeologist Michael Willis, the tradition of charitable feeding houses for Brahmins and the needy can be traced to the mid-2nd century CE in an Kushana era inscription. The Garhwa inscriptions, states Willis, when combined with the Bilsad and Podagarh inscriptions suggests that sattra were attached to Hindu temples and these were charity-based community kitchens that fed the "Brahmins, wandering ascetics (sadhus) and the destitute". This endowment-driven activity was deemed to be an aspect of Hindu puja. Willis adds that the damaged Gadhwa inscriptions leaves it unclear whether the sattra was "for the benefit of brahmins" or was "established and run by the Brahmins" financed by the king's endowment.
