= Shankarnagar, Madhya Pradesh =

Town in Madhya Pradesh

Shankarnagar is a town in Umaria district of Madhya Pradesh. The Raja of Shankargarh has mining rights over 46 villages (covering an area of 150 km^{2}) in perpetuity and gives the rights to contractors who in turn hire local labourers to extract minerals . It is famous for Silica mines.

== Demographics ==
Country / India; State / Uttar Pradesh; District / Prayagraj; Population(2011): • Total / 17,785; Language: • Official / Hindi; • Additional official / Urdu; Time zone / UTC+5:30 (IST); Vehicle registration / UP-70

As of 2011 Indian Census, Shankargarh had a total population of 17,785, of which 9,343 were males and 8,442 were females. Population within the age group of 0 to 6 years was 2,712. The total number of literates in Shankargarh was 11,442, which constituted 64.3% of the population with male literacy of 69.8% and female literacy of 58.3%. The effective literacy rate of 7+ population of Shankargarh was 75.9%, of which male literacy rate was 83.2% and female literacy rate was 68.0%. The Scheduled Castes and Scheduled Tribes population was 4,087 and 107 respectively. Shankargarh had 3095 households in 2011.

As of 2001 the India census, Shankargarh had a population of 13,116. Males constitute 53% of the population and females 47%. Shankargarh has an average literacy rate of 61%, higher than the national average of 59.5%: male literacy is 70%, and female literacy is 52%. In Shankargarh, 17% of the population is under 6 years of age.

Region: Shankargarh is Block in Allahabad District of Uttar Pradesh State, India. Shankargarh Block Headquarters is Shankargarh town . It belongs to Allahabad Division . Allahabad City, Citrakoot city, Rewa City, Varanasi City are the nearby Cities to Shankargarh. It is in the 145 m elevation(altitude).

Gupta Period Historical place Garhwa Fort is situated near (5 km) from Shankargarh. Garhwa fort is located in town Shankargarh, approximately 50 KM south to Allahabad. It was built in year 1750, but it has few remains of structures of Gupta dynasty (240-605 CE).

Garhwa Fort

Allahabad, Chitrakoot, Varanasi, Rewa, Vindhyachal, Satna are the nearby Important tourist destinations to see. Hindi is the Local Language here. Also People Speaks Urdu, Awadhi, Bagheli .

== Industries ==
Prayagraj Power Generation Company Limited is a coal-based, 3*660MW, super critical thermal power plant located in Shankargarh (Bara Tehsil) in Prayagraj District, Uttar Pradesh. The power plant is owned by Renascent Power, a subsidiary of the Tata power Power. The total cost of the project was INR 12,000 crores. In November 2019 Resurgent Power Ventures Pte. Limited (Resurgent Power) has announced closing the deal for acquiring 75 per cent stake in Jaiprakash Associates Ltd's Prayagraj Power.

BPCL also reassessing plan to build refinery in Shankargarh, Prayagraj

== River ==
Yamuna River is lifeline for this region which is 20 km in radius from Shankargarh Block. Various irrigation projects are going on to make near areas more fertile and suitable for farming. Economy of this area depends mainly on agriculture and silica mining

== Politics ==
BJP, SP, BSP are the major political parties in this area. Shankargarh Block comes under Bara assembly constituency, current sitting MLA is Dr. Ajay Kumar contested and won from SP party Shankargarh Block comes under Allahabad parliament constituency, current sitting MP is Ujjwal Raman Singh from INC.

== Silica mines ==
The main occupation of the local population is mining activity and stone quarrying, as the land is not very fertile. The Raja of Shankargarh has mining rights over 46 villages (covering an area of 150 km^{2}) in perpetuity and gives the rights to contractors who in turn hire local labourers to extract minerals.
