= Michael D. Willis =

Michael Willis is an Indologist and historian based at Royal Asiatic Society of Great Britain and Ireland in London. Born in Vancouver, British Columbia and raised in Kuwait and Saudi Arabia, Willis took his B.A. degree at the University of Victoria where he studied with Siri Gunasinghe and Alan Gowans. At the University of Chicago, he studied with J. A. B. van Buitenen and Pramod Chandra, receiving his doctoral degree in 1988 after periods in India and Cyprus. He joined the British Museum in 1994 after teaching at SUNY New Paltz. He was the curator of the early south Asian and Himalayan collections in the Department of Asia at the museum from 1994 until 2014 at which time he became Corresponding Principal Investigator of Beyond Boundaries, a research project funded by the European Research Council. The project ended in 2020.

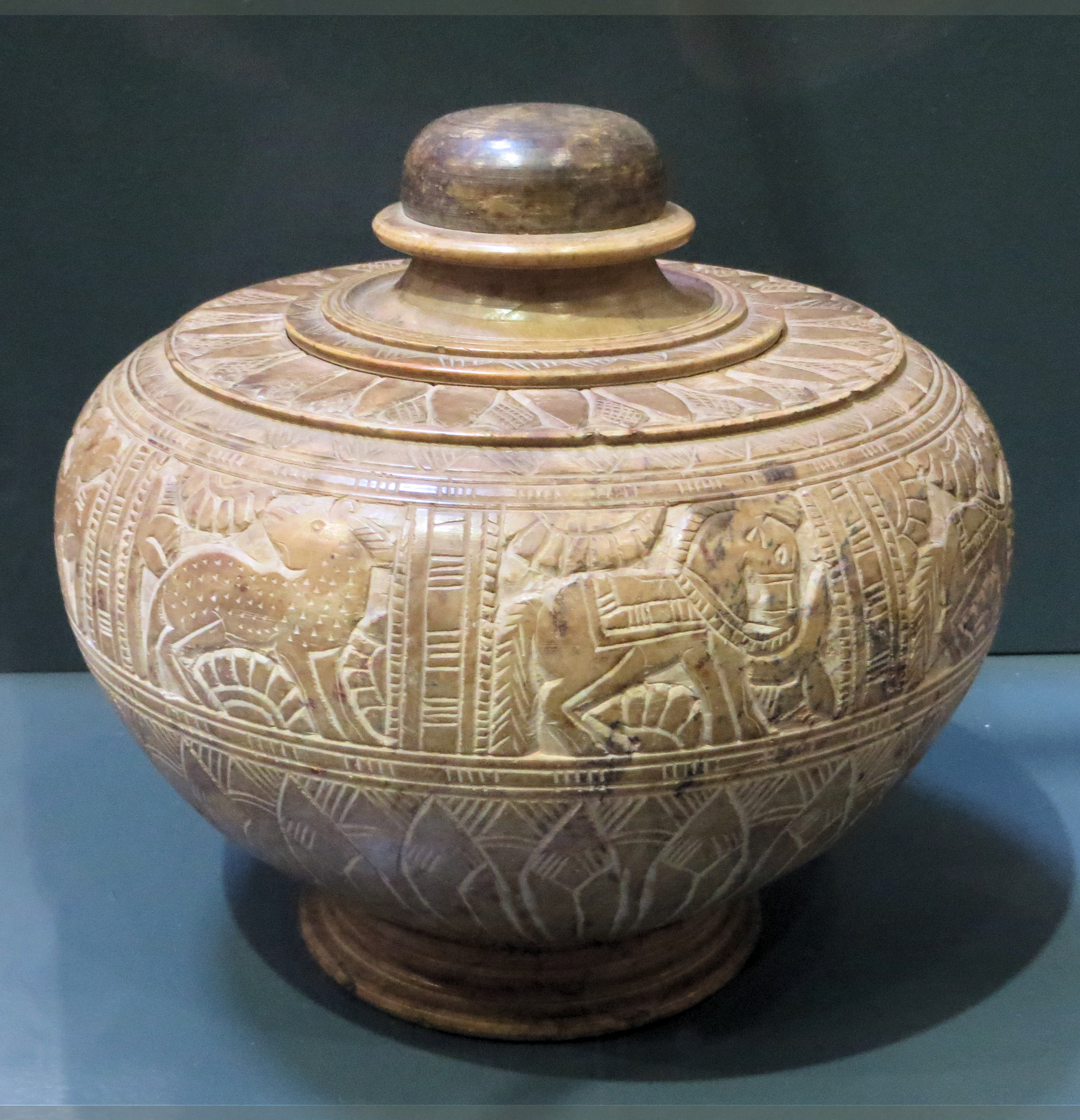
Reliquary from Sonari Stūpa no. 2 in the Victoria and Albert Museum, published in Buddhist Reliquaries from Ancient India.

Willis's main research interest has been the cultural, political and religious history of India from early times to the advent of colonialism. He has published on the inscriptions of central India and its early temple architecture. After that, Willis turned his attention to the Gupta dynasty, publishing a monograph on Hindu ritual and the development of temples as land-holding institutions, The Archaeology of Hindu Ritual (2009).

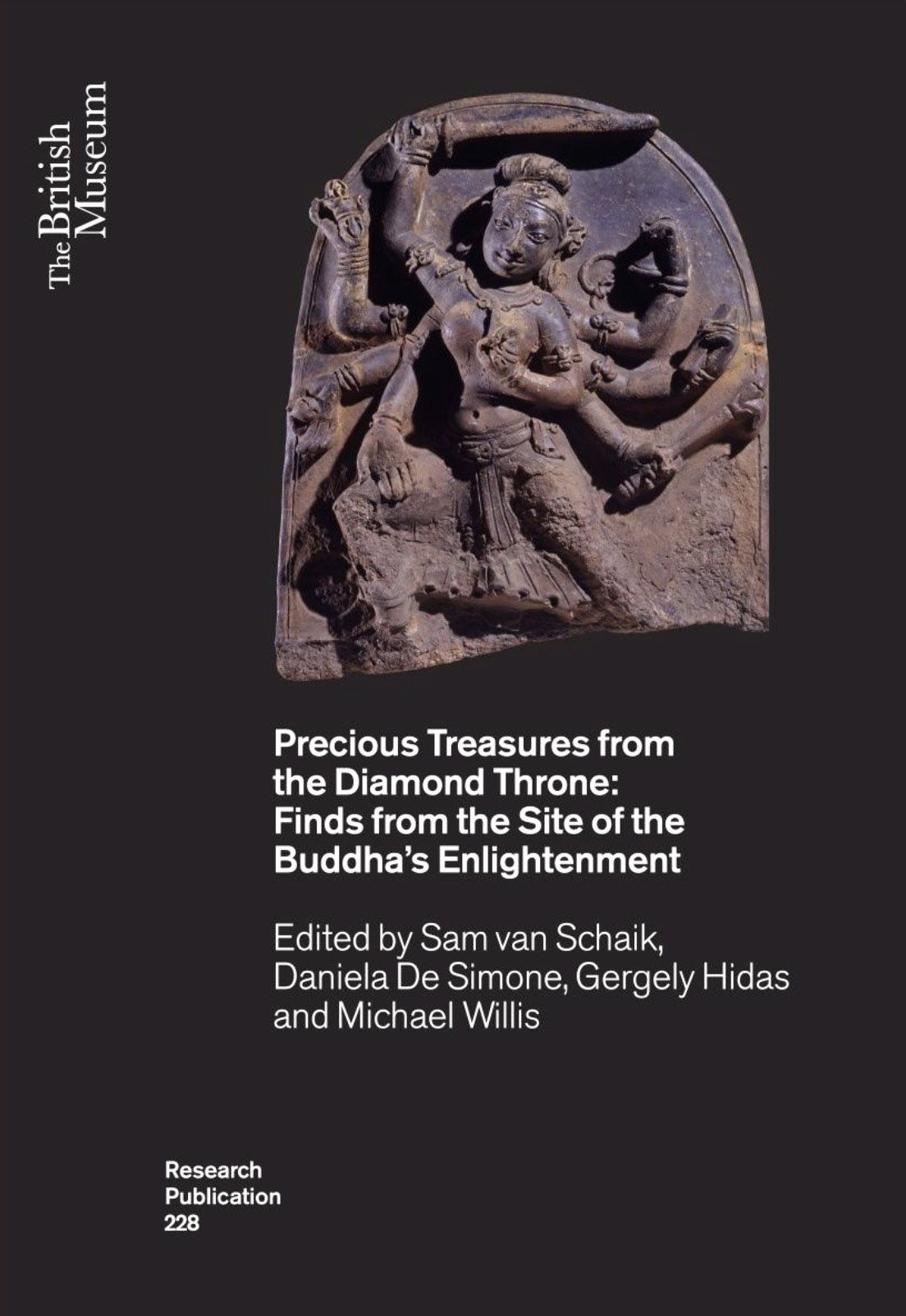
Cover of Precious Treasures from the Diamond Throne, published by British Museum Press.

Willis has also researched the Buddhist history of India and produced a catalogue of reliquaries and related materials in the British Museum and Victoria and Albert Museum. Concurrently Willis developed an interest in Tibet and published a popular book on the subject. This developed into a study of the Testament of Ba and a text and translation of the earliest surviving manuscript. Most recently, Willis was part of a team that examined the documentation and finds from Bodhgaya, including much material in the British Library and British Museum. This appeared as Precious Treasures from the Diamond Throne, published in 2021.

In the area of the Islamic history of India, Willis led Digitization of Documents from the Sufi Shrines at Dhar in India, a project funded by Endangered Archives Programme at the British Library.
