= Shankargarh =

Town in Uttar Pradesh, India

- Town
- Location in Uttar Pradesh, India Shankargarh (India)
- Coordinates: 25°11′N 81°37′E
- Country: India
- State: Uttar Pradesh
- District: Prayagraj

Population (2011)
  - Total: 17,785

Language
  - Official: Hindi
  - Additional official: Urdu
- Time zone: UTC+5:30 (IST)
- Vehicle registration: UP-70

Shankargarh is a town and a nagar panchayat in Prayagraj district in the Indian state of Uttar Pradesh. It is also known as Kasauta Shankargarh.

== History ==
Maharaja Vyaghradev Solanki, a scion of Anhilwara Patan in Gujrat, fl. 1234 A.D. (631 H.E.), he was a Baghel Rajput King who laid foundation of Baghelkhand (House of Baghel); married Maharani Singhumati, daughter of Makund Dev Chandravat, and had issue, five sons.

-Maharaja Karan Dev, succeeded to Rewa (princely state).

-Kirti Dev

-Surya Dev

-Shyam Dev

-Rao Kandhar Dev, ancestor of the Bara Rajas or the Raos of Kasauta (Shankargarh).

Rao Kandhar Dev who was the 5th son of Maharaja Vyaghradev of Rewa (princely state), born 663 Samvat, in 683 Samvat his elder brother conferred on him the title of Rao (and later on the title of 'Maharao') with Illaka Pardhwan, which yielded an income of Rs. 12 Lac per annum, from that time the family is known as the Kasauta Rao family who ruled the area of Shankargarh, which comes under Prayagraj district of Uttar Pradesh.

Raja Bahadur Rao Vikramjit Singh, Rao of Kasauta, 27th in descent from Maharaja Vyghra Dev of Rewa (princely state), in 1185 H.E. (1771–1772 CE) the Emperor of Delhi conferred on him the title of 'Raja Bahadur' and a command of 2000 cavalry and 2500 infantry and at that time the British Power was established in the country.

In the mid of 17th century one of their descendant Jagat Rai Singh Baghel, who was the youngest son of Maharao Raja Bahadur Makrand Rai Singh Baghel of Kasauta (Shankargarh), and the younger brother of Bhagwant Rai Singh Baghel, migrated towards present day Satna and established the Kothi Princely State, presently which comes under Satna district of Madhya Pradesh. The Rao Sahibs of Churhat (the royal family of Churhat, Sidhi, Madhya Pradesh) along with the Kothi royal family of Kothi State (Kothi, Satna, MP), are descendants of the Kasauta Rao family of Shankargarh (Prayagraj, Uttar Pradesh).

During the British Raj, it was known as Kasuta Shankargarh Bara Rajya. Maharao Raja Shrimant Kamlakar Singh Baghel was most known among all the emperors of the region because of a landmark established by him, the Raja Kamlakar Inter College. Later on in 2000, Raja Kamlakar Degree College was established by Maharao Raja Shrimant Mahendra Pratap Singh Baghel. These two landmarks are leading the education in the area.

Maharao Raja Shrimant Mahendra Pratap Singh Baghel, who is the present Raja of Kasuta Shankargarh Bara Rajya, was married to Rani Devyani Kumariji Sahiba, daughter of H.H Raja Digvijay Singh Bahadur of Sailana State (Ratlam, MP). And Maharao Raja Shrimant Mahendra Pratap Singh Baghel is 32nd in descent from Maharaja Vyghra Dev of Rewa (princely state).

Gupta Period historical place Garhwa Fort is situated near (5 km) from Shankargarh, approximately 50 km south of Allahabad. It was built in the year 1750, but it has few remains of structures of Gupta dynasty (240-605 CE).

== Demographics ==
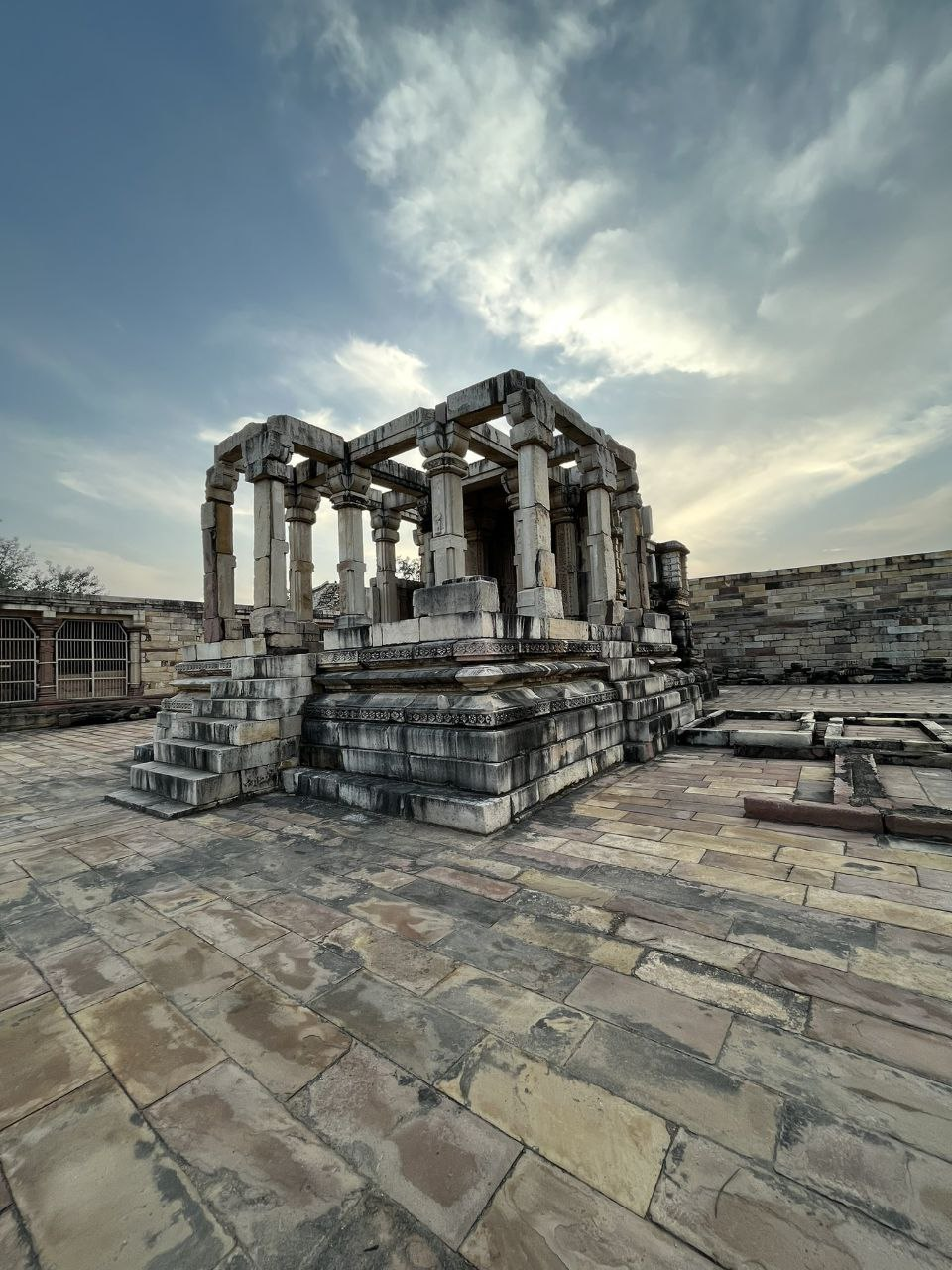
Garhwa Fort temple.

As of 2011 Indian Census, Shankargarh had a total population of 17,785, of which 9,343 were males and 8,442 were females. Population within the age group of 0 to 6 years was 2,712. The total number of literates in Shankargarh was 11,442, which constituted 64.3% of the population with male literacy of 69.8% and female literacy of 58.3%. The effective literacy rate of 7+ population of Shankargarh was 75.9%, of which male literacy rate was 83.2% and female literacy rate was 68.0%. The Scheduled Castes and Scheduled Tribes population was 4,087 and 107 respectively. Shankargarh had 3095 households in 2011.

As of 2001 the India census, Shankargarh had a population of 13,116. Males constitute 53% of the population and females 47%. Shankargarh has an average literacy rate of 61%, higher than the national average of 59.5%: male literacy is 70%, and female literacy is 52%. In Shankargarh, 17% of the population is under 6 years of age.

Region: Shankargarh is Block in Allahabad District of Uttar Pradesh State, India. Shankargarh Block Headquarters is Shankargarh town. It belongs to Allahabad Division. Allahabad City, Citrakoot city, Rewa City, Varanasi City are the nearby Cities to Shankargarh. It is at the 145 m elevation(altitude).

Allahabad, Chitrakoot, Varanasi, Rewa, Vindhyachal, Satna are the nearby Important tourist destinations to see. Hindi is the Local Language here. Also People Speaks Urdu, Awadhi, Bagheli .

== Industries ==
Prayagraj Power Generation Company Limited is a coal-based, 3*660MW, super critical thermal power plant located in Shankargarh (Bara Tehsil) in Prayagraj District, Uttar Pradesh. The power plant is owned by Renascent Power, a subsidiary of the Tata power Power. The total cost of the project was INR 12,000 crores.[1] In November 2019 Resurgent Power Ventures Pte. Limited (Resurgent Power) has announced closing the deal for acquiring 75 per cent stake in Jaiprakash Associates Ltd's Prayagraj Power.

BPCL also reassessing plan to build refinery in Shankargarh, Prayagraj

== River ==
Yamuna River is lifeline for this region which is 20 km in radius from Shankargarh Block. Various irrigation projects are going on to make nearest areas more fertile and suitable for farming. Economy of this area depends mainly on agriculture and silica mining.

The Loni river is the major river and is called the lifeline of Shankargarh.

== Politics ==
BJP, SP, BSP are the major political parties in this area. Shankargarh Block comes under Bara assembly constituency, current sitting MLA is Dr. Ajay Kumar contested and won from SP party Shankargarh Block comes under Allahabad parliament constituency, current sitting MP is Ujjwal Raman Singh from INC

== Silica mines ==
The main occupation of the local population is mining activity and stone quarrying, as the land is not very fertile. The Raja of Shankargarh has mining rights over 46 villages (covering an area of 150 km^{2}) in perpetuity and gives the rights to contractors who in turn hire local labourers to extract minerals.
