= Garhwa Fort =

- गढ़वा क़िला (Hindi)
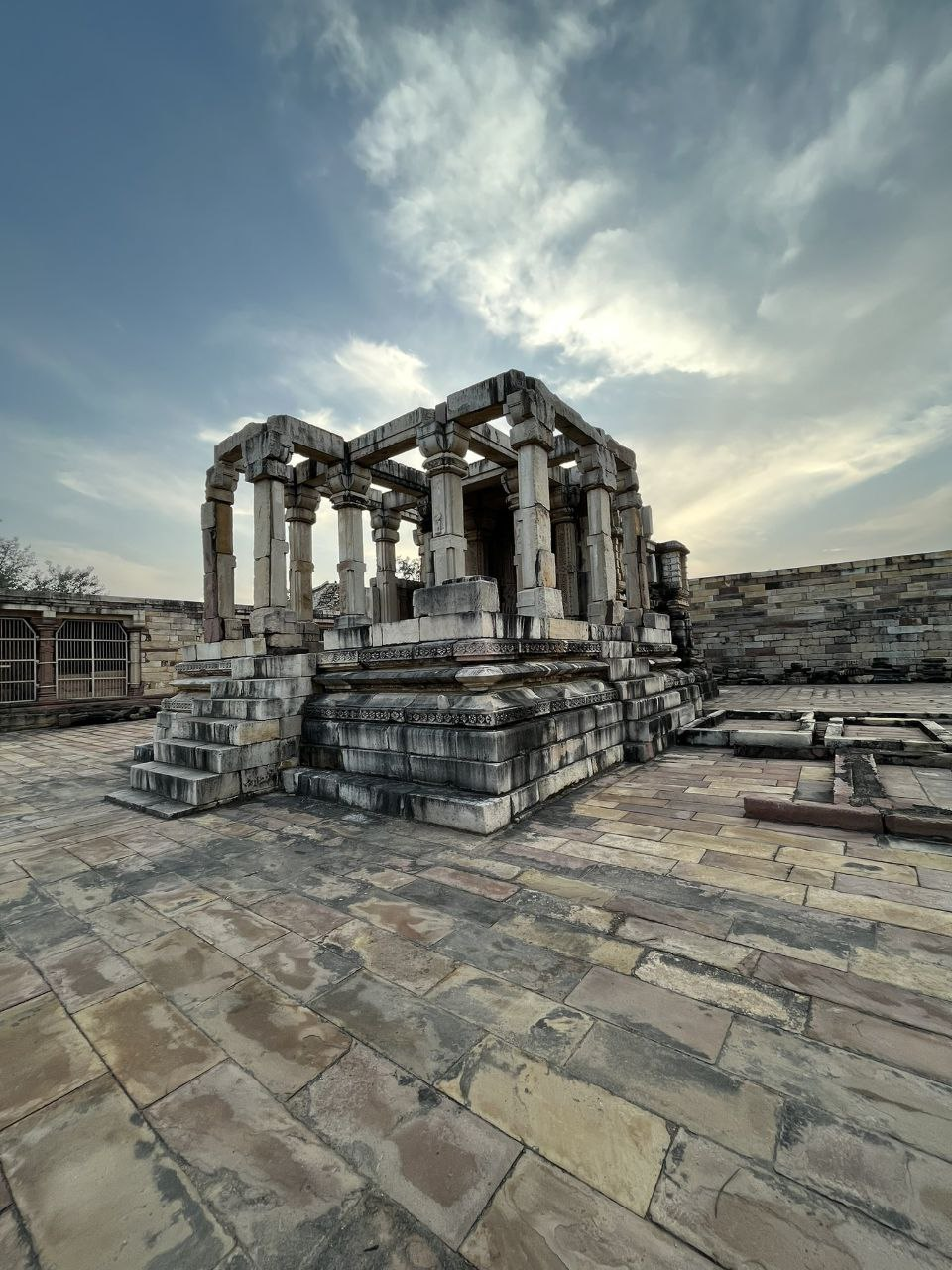
- Garhwa fort, temple complex
- Interactive map of Garhwa Fort
- 25.226151°N 81.585903°E
- Location: Shankargarh, Prayagraj district

History
- Built: 5th-6th CE

Site notes
- Architectural style: Hindu
- Restored by: Archaeological Survey of India
- Governing body: Archaeological Survey of India

Garhwa fort is a medieval fortified enclosure, housing a temple complex in Prayagraj district, Uttar Pradesh, India, belonging to the Gupta Period. It is most known for its Gadhwa Stone Inscriptions early 5th-century CE Sanskrit inscriptions by Chandragupta II and Kumaragupta. The fort is situated 50 km south-west of Prayagraj, on the Jabalpur road, 5 km from Shankargarh.

The ancient name of Garhwa was Bhattpraya; in fact, there is a village called Bhattgarh nearby, which is currently named Bargarh. The ruins of the temple were fortified in the 1750 by Vishwanath Singh Deo, a Baghelkhand ruler belonging to Rewa princely state. The fortification consisted of a square enclosure and parapets, giving a fortress kind of look. There are also two bawli (stepwell) in the complex. The temple has many relics belonging to the Gupta period, which date back to as far as the 5th and 6th centuries. The most notable item in the fort is a carved slab of stone, 6–7 feet high, representing all Dashavatara (10 avatars) of Lord Vishnu, belonging to the 11th or 12th century.

Only 1 km away from the fort complex lies Bhita, an archeological site dating to Mauryan and Post-Mauryan era (320 BCE - 185 BCE). Here the remains of an ancient Indian town were discovered, complete with extensive housing blocks along several streets, where some houses had up to fifteen rooms arranged around a large open courtyard. This site was first explored by Alexander Cunningham in the 1870s, uncovered a series of 5th-century CE Sanskrit inscriptions of Gupta era, and later by John Marshall. Subsequently, a Mukhalinga, that a Shivlinga with five faces. dating to the 2nd century BCE was also discovered on the site.

== Raghava-Yatra Inscription ==
On December 18, 2024, one of the earliest known prashasti (eulogy) inscription found in India mentioning worship of King Rama during Ram Navami festival, was discovered here. It dates to Chaitra Shukla paksha Ekadashi, 1152 Vikram Samvat (11th day in Chaitra month, 1096 CE), in the reign of the Chandela king Kirtivarman (1060-1100 CE), whose minister Vatsaraja Srivastava issued the edict. The ruined temple in the Garhwa Fort complex commemorates the site on the banks of the Yamuna River, where Rama, Lakshman, and Sita spent a night on their way to Chitrakuta, from where they proceed to crossing Ganges River at Shringverpur.

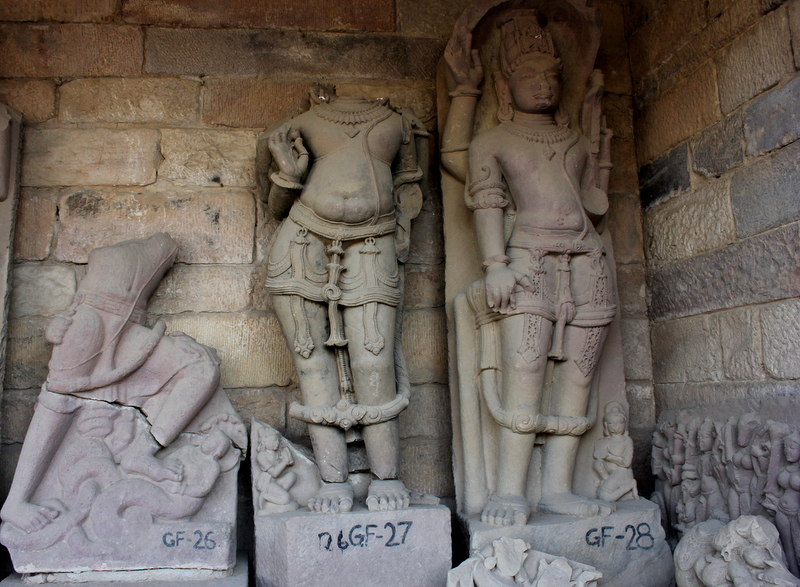
Sculptures

== Gallery ==
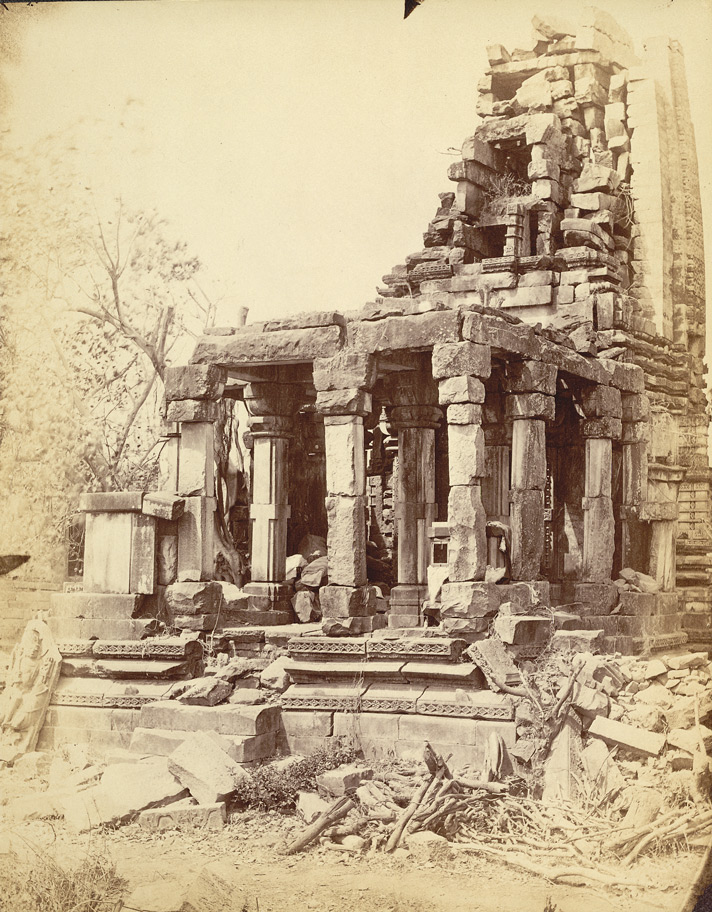
Temple ruins at Garhwa in 1870.

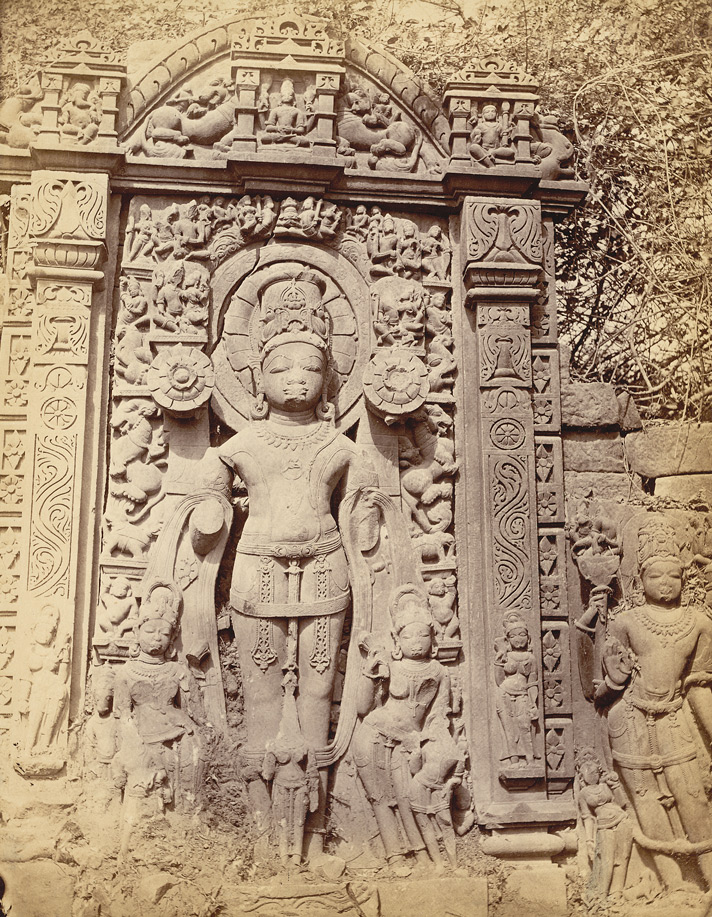
Sculpture of Aditya, the Sun god, of Gupta period, from Garhwa, Allahabad, 1870s photo

Kurma (Tortoise) avatar and Reliefs at Garhwa, 1897

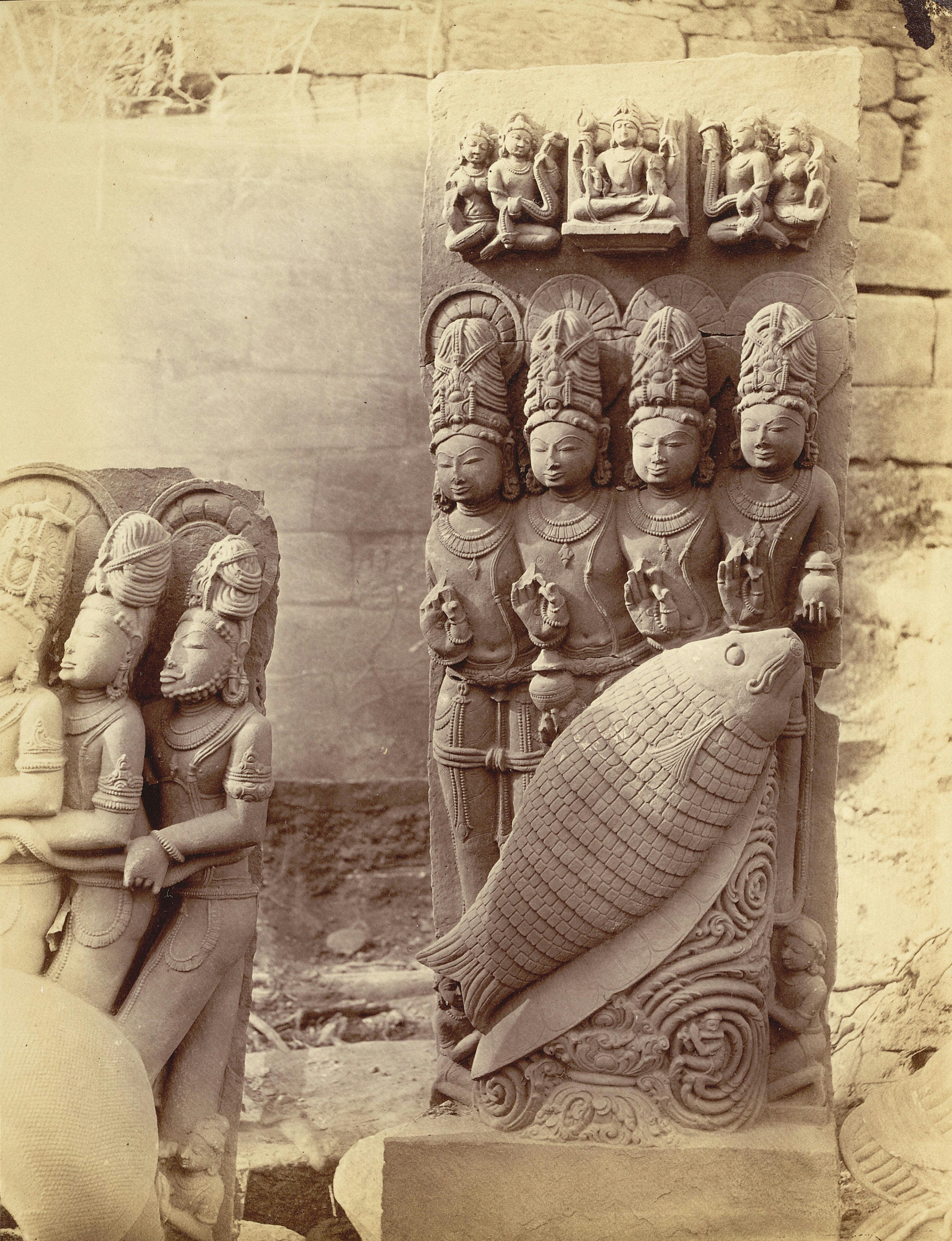
Matsya avatar (fish incarnation of Vishnu)

A relief

Sculptures at Garhwa

Brahma sculpture.
