= Alan Gowans =

Alan Gowans (November 30, 1923 – August 19, 2001) was an art historian and university academic, educated at the University of Toronto and Princeton University. A charismatic teacher and prolific author, his academic specialty was North American architecture, frequently highlighting such unheralded structures as gas stations, restaurants, motels, bungalows and mail-order homes, and exploring their social, cultural and national significance. Perhaps his most influential work was Images of American Living.

A partial list of the teaching and research institutions at which Gowans held teaching positions includes: Rutgers University, Middlebury College, Harvard University, University of Edinburgh, Stockholm University and Uppsala University. A former president of the Society of Architectural Historians, he served as chairman of the art history department at the University of Delaware and as founding chairman of the Department of History in Art at the University of Victoria in Victoria, British Columbia. From Victoria, he spearheaded an international and cross-cultural approach to the history of art, bringing notable scholars such as Siri Gunasinghe to the new university, and guest lecturers as varied as Immanuel Velikovsky, Boris Piotrovsky and Hans Wolfgang Müller.

In 1988 he settled in Washington DC, archiving an extensive personal collection of architectural photographs. This unique collection, which includes more than 10,000 slides and images of vernacular architecture, was gifted to the Department of Image Collections at the National Gallery of Art Library in 1994 and is accessible to researchers. Gowans acted as a consultant for the Ken Burns/Lynn Novick Film Frank Lloyd Wright (1998). He continued to live a scholar's life until his death in 2001.

== Gallery ==
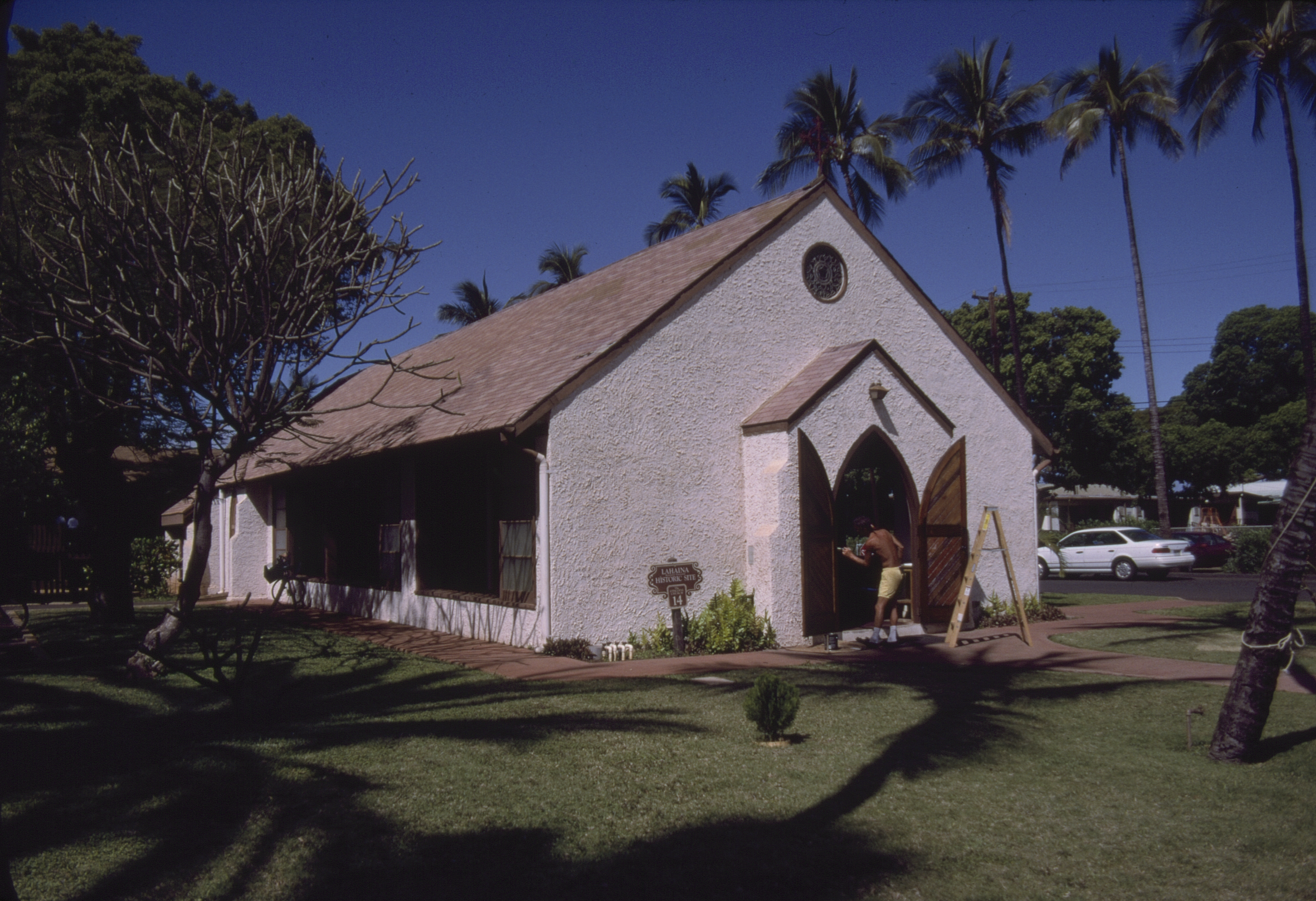
Holy Innocents Church. Lahaina, Hawaii. Photograph by Alan Gowans. Department of Image Collections, National Gallery of Art Library.

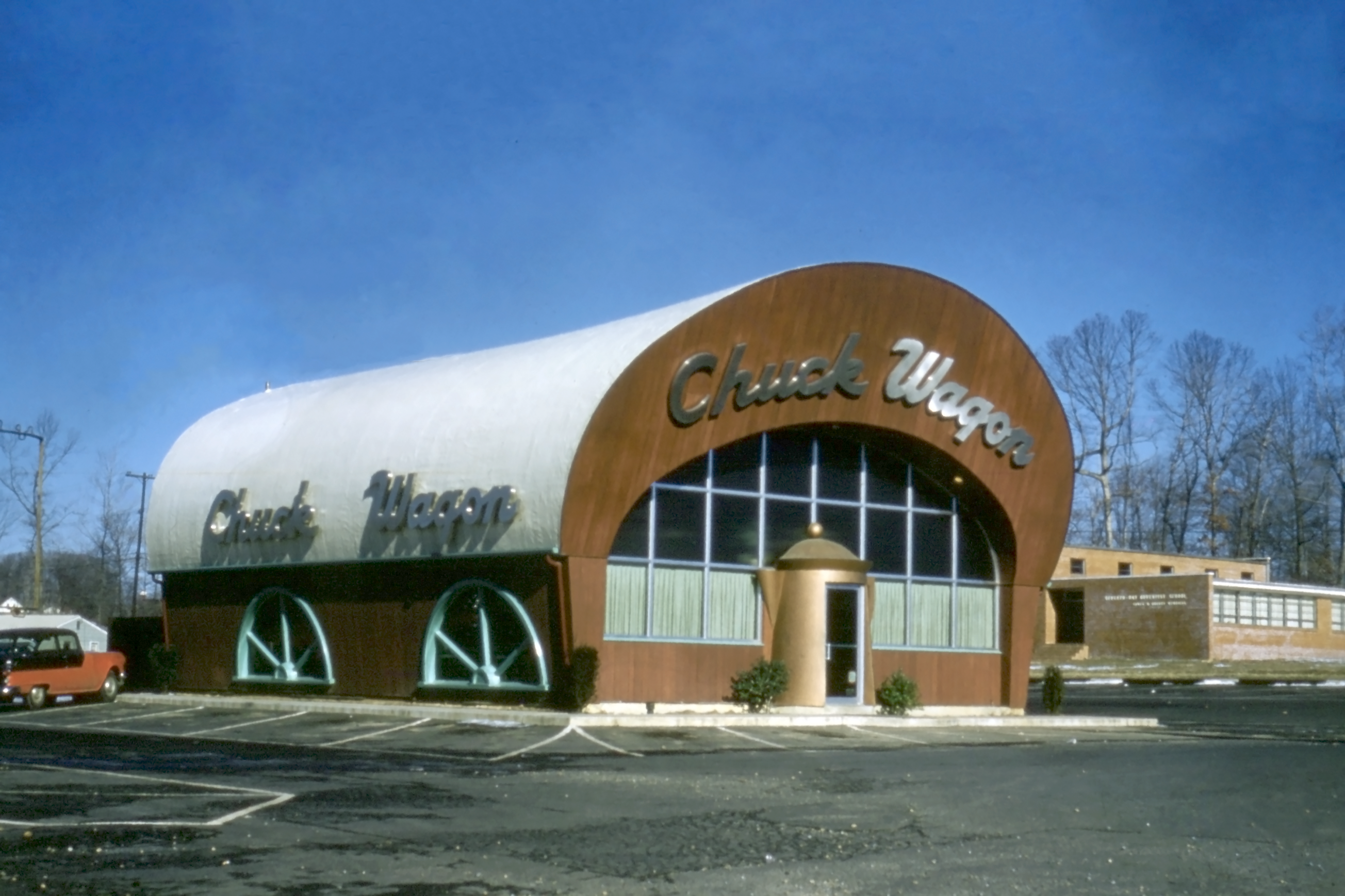
Chuck Wagon Diner in Marshallton, Delaware, c. 1955. Photograph by Alan Gowans. Department of Image Collections, National Gallery of Art Library.

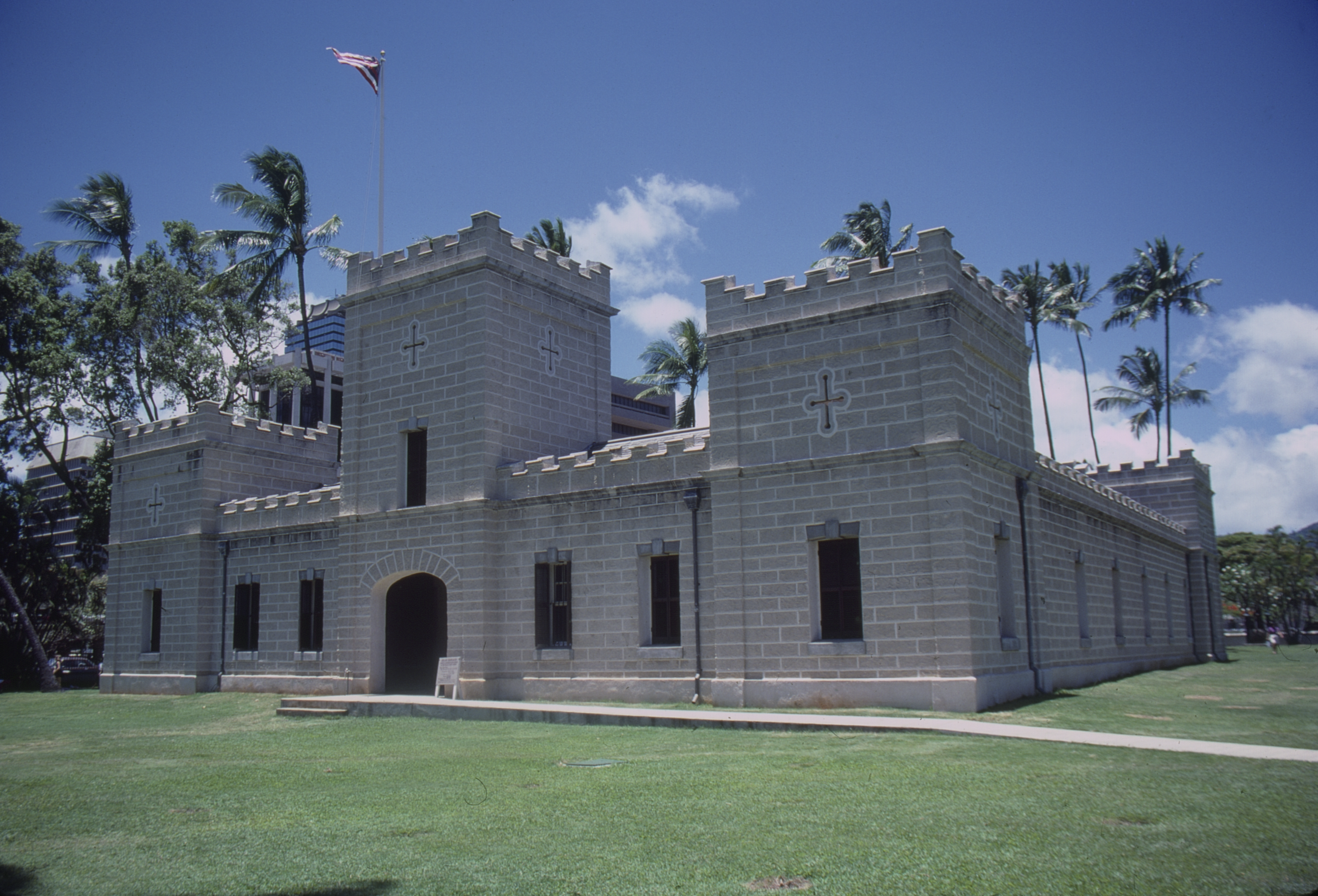
Iolani Barracks in Honolulu, Hawaii. Photograph by Alan Gowans. Department of Image Collections, National Gallery of Art Library.

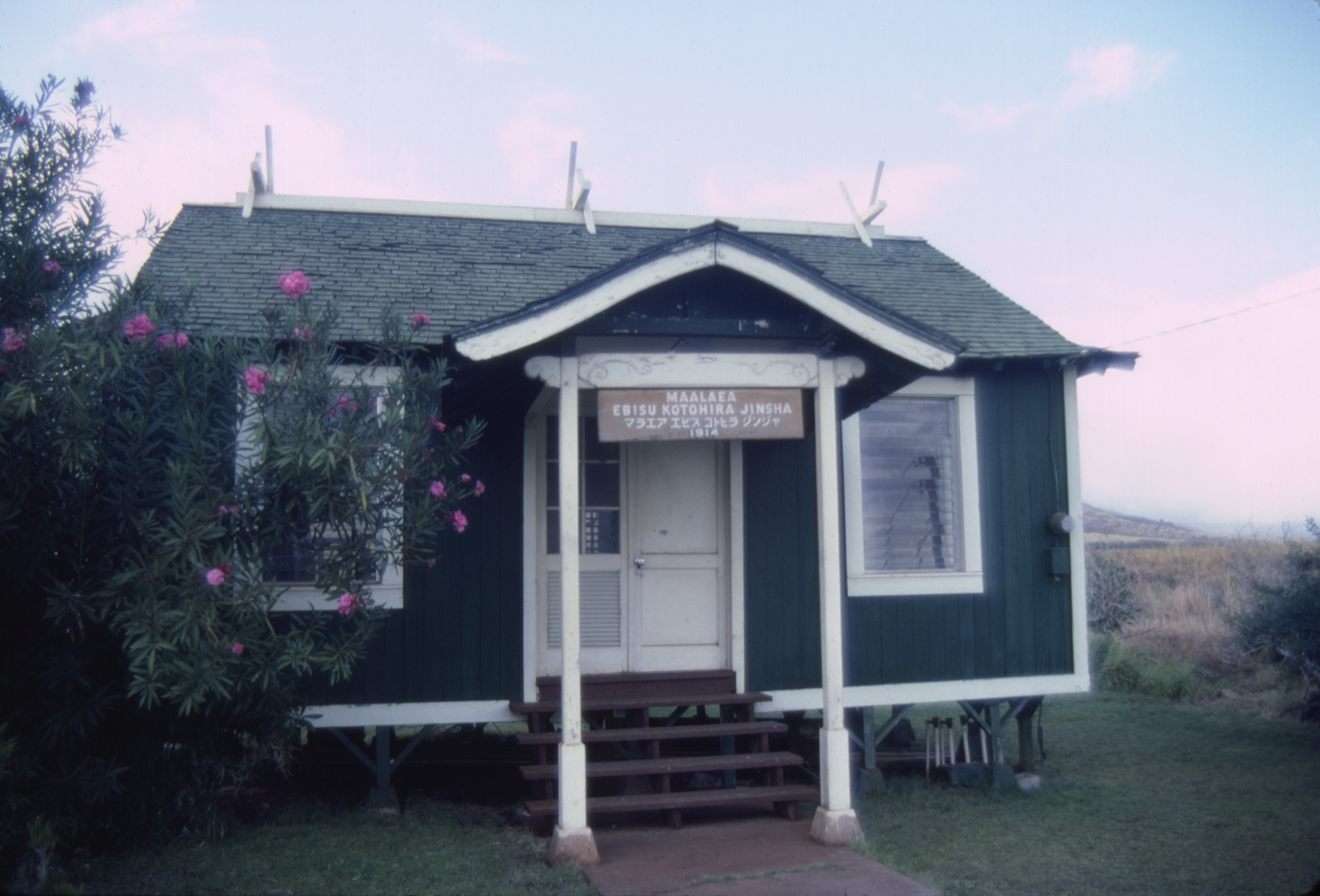
Maalaea Shrine in Hawaii. Photograph by Alan Gowans. Department of Image Collections, National Gallery of Art Library.

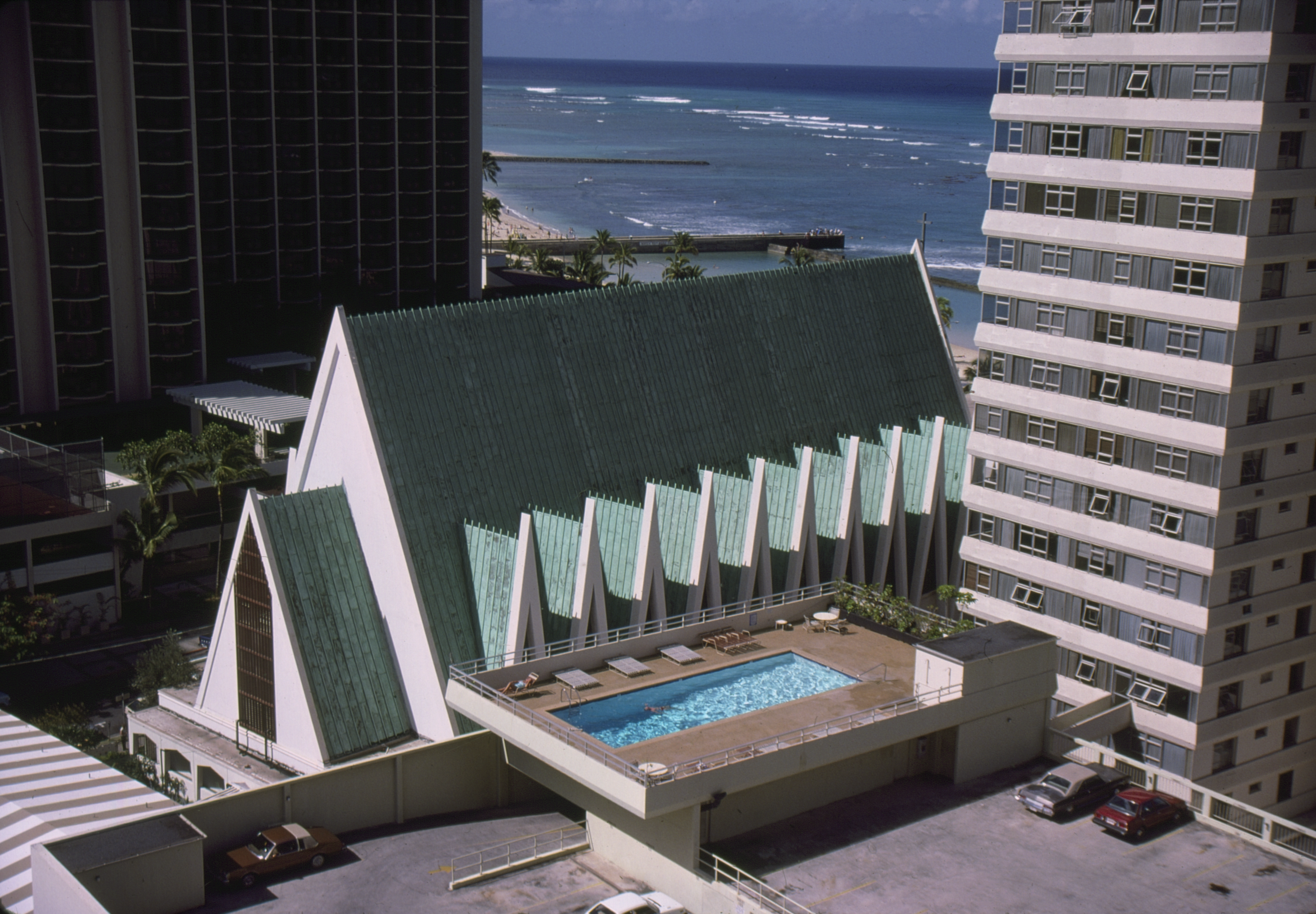
St. Augustine by the Sea in Honolulu, Hawaii. Photograph by Alan Gowans. Department of Image Collections, National Gallery of Art Library.
