= Maharaja Hastin =

Maharaja Hastin was a feudatory of the Gupta Dynasty and a member and ruler of the Parivrajaka dynasty. He is known from the Khoh copper plate land grant, records a land grant of a village to certain brahmanas by him.

According to the Khoh inscription of his son Samkshobha, Hastin ruled the kingdom of ābhala (or āhala; later Dahala) and the 18 aavi-rājya ("forest kingdoms"). The identity of these 18 forest kingdoms is not certain, but they were most probably in the Vindhyan region.

Hastin ruled for at least 42 years, as his earliest extant inscription is dated to the year 156, and his last inscription is dated to the year 198. Assuming these years to be in the Gupta era, Hastin would have been a contemporary of the Gupta kings Budhagupta, Vainyagupta, Bhanugupta and possibly Narasimhagupta. Budhagupta was a relatively strong ruler among these, and Hastin appears to have been his vassal. This theory is corroborated by the discovery of a copper-plate inscription issued during Budhagupta's reign from Sankarapur in Sidhi district.

Hastin was a Shaivite, as suggested by his Bhumara inscription, which describes him as meditating at the feet of Mahadeva (Shiva).

Some ancient silver coins bearing the legend "Raa Hastin" have been discovered. Historians such as E. J. Rapson, R. D. Banerji and B. P. Sinha identified him with Hastin on palaeographic basis. However, Dasharatha Sharma and P. L. Gupta identify him with the Pratihara king Vatsaraja who held the title "Rana-hastin" according to the Kuvalayamālā of Udyyotana Suri. According to Gupta, these coins cannot be dated before the 8th century CE. This theory is corroborated by the fact that no Gupta vassals issued coins in their own names.
