= List of Gupta emperors =

Maharajadhiraja of the Gupta Empire
- Imperial
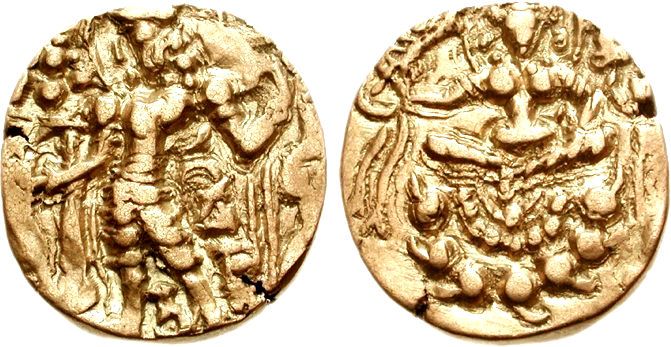
- Last to reign Vishnugupta; 540 CE – 550 CE

Details
- Style: His Majesty
- First monarch: Chandragupta I (as the successor to the King of Magadha)
- Last monarch: Vishnugupta
- Formed: 319 CE 1706–1707 years ago
- Abolished: 550 CE 1475–1476 years ago
- Residences: Pataliputra (319–550 CE); Ujjain (3rd century); Ayodhya (3rd century)
- Appointer: Hereditary
- Pretender: Later Gupta dynasty

The Gupta Empire (c. 319–550 CE) was a classical Indian Hindu empire. The dynasty was founded by Sri Gupta in late 3rd century CE, but Chandragupta I is credited as the real founder of the empire. The empire lasted until 550 CE. The factors for the downfall of the empire were Hunnic invasions, dynastic dissensions, taxes, internal rebellions and decentralization. The Gupta Dynasty, according to all the Puranas, Krishnaraja Vrittanta, etc, was from 327 BC to 82 BC. However, Sir William Jones committed a grave error by replacing the Guptas with Chandragupta Maurya, who ruled Magadha from 1534 BC to 1500 BC. (Maurya Dynasty ruled Magadha from 1534 BC to 1218 BC, after which other dynasties took over the Magadha Kingdom : Shunga Dynasty (1218 BC to 918 BC); Kanva Dynasty (918 BC to 833 BC); Andhra Dynasty (833 BC to 327 BC), when taken over by Chandragupta of Gupta Dynasty. This error by Sir Jones has caused the deletion of about 1,207 years from the ancient Indian history. Unfortunately, the later British, European and Indian historians followed Sir William Jones, who had offered to correct his writings, if fresh evidences are provided, but none came! The account of Megasthenes has caused the near-destruction of the Ancient History of India.

The Gupta Empire was vast and covered most of the Indian subcontinent. Chandragupta I, Samudragupta, Chandragupta II and Skandagupta were some of its mightiest rulers. It brought about a golden era to the region, resulting in technological advancements and cultural improvements.

The Gupta emperors used the titles of Maharajadhiraja ("Great King of Kings"), Samrat ("Supreme King" or "Emperor"), Chakravartin ("Universal Monarch"), etc. The Gupta empresses used the titles of Paramabhattarika-Rajni ("Supreme Queen" or "Samrajni"), Mahadevi ("Great Goddess"), etc.

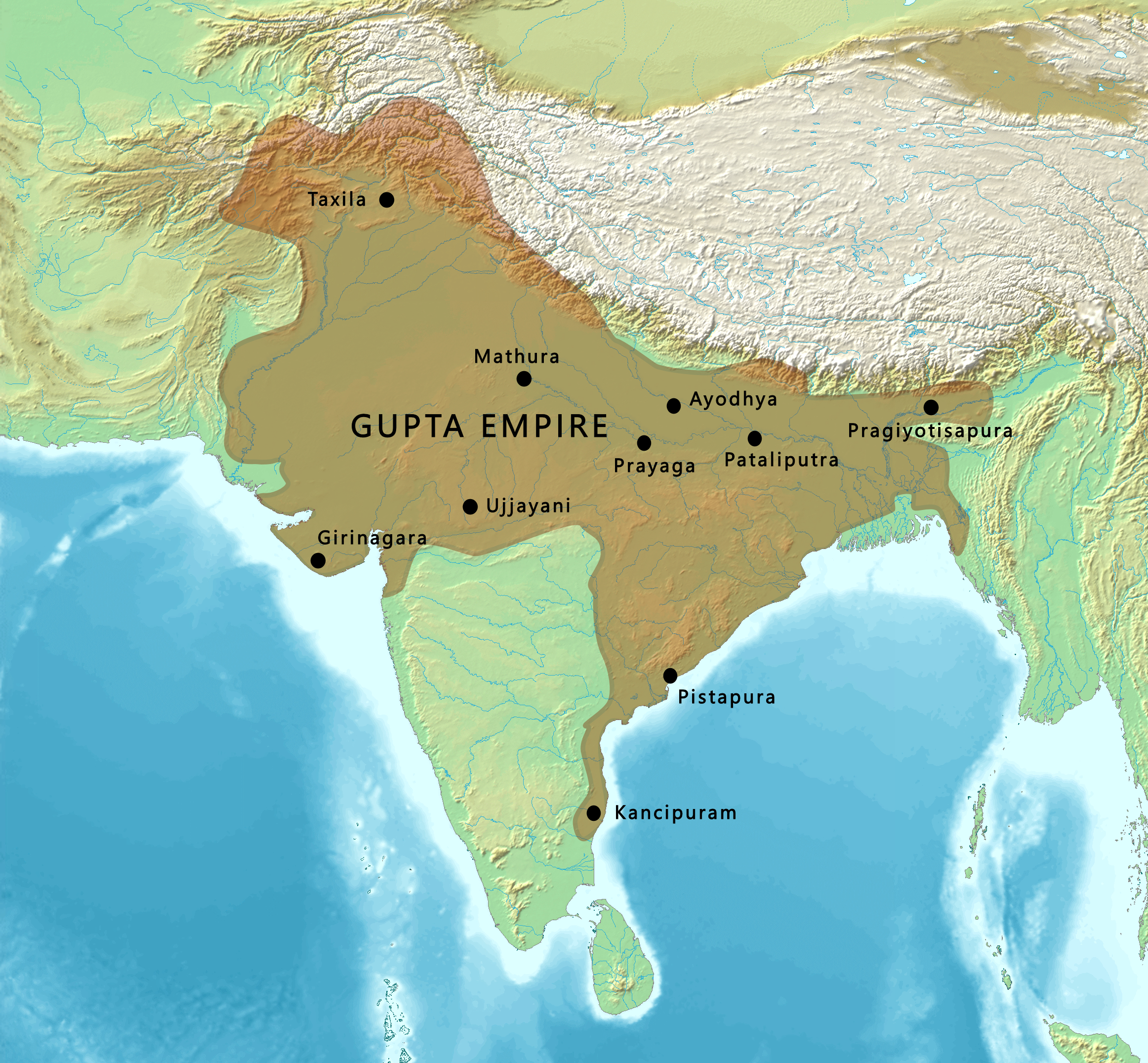
Gupta Empire at its greatest expansion, c. 400 CE

== Family tree ==
Gupta dynasty

Gupta Kingdom
Gupta^{(1)} r. c. 3rd Century
Ghatotkacha^{(2)} r. c. 3rd–4th Century
Gupta Empire
Chandragupta I^{(3)} r. c. 319-335/50
?
Samudragupta^{(5)} r. c. 335/50-375	Kacha^{(4)} r. c. 4th Century
?
Chandragupta II^{(7)} r. c. 375–415	Ramagupta^{(6)} r. c. 4th Century
Kumaragupta I^{(8)} r. c. 415–455
Skandagupta^{(8)} r. c. 455–467	Purugupta^{(9)} r. c. 467–473
Kumaragupta II^{(10)} r. c. 473–476	Budhagupta^{(11)} r. c. 476–495	Narasimhagupta^{(12)} r. c. 495–530
Kumaragupta III^{(13)} r. c. 530–540
Vishnugupta^{(14)} r. c. 540–550

== List of rulers ==
Estimates of the regnal dates (in CE) of Gupta kings
Name (IAST)	A. S. Altekar (1957)	Coinage	B. C. Chhabra (1986)	S. R. Goyal (2005)	K. K. Thaplyal (2010)	S. Kumar (2024)
Gupta alias Śri-gupta		260–280	270–290	295–300	269–294	269–294
Ghaṭotkacha		280–300	290–305	300–319	294/299–319	?–319
Chandragupta I (possibly with Kumaradevi)		320–330	305–325	319–350	319–343	319–343
Samudragupta		330–370	330–370	350	344–374	344–378
Rāmagupta	—		370–374	—	374–376	378–381
Kācha(-gupta)		—	325–330	350–353		382 (Note: Kumar theorizes that Ramagupta assumed the regnal name Kāchagupta)
Chandragupta II		375–412	375–414	376–413	376–412	383–412
Kumāragupta I		416–450	414–455	415–449	415–455	407–450
Ghaṭotkachagupta		435	—	5th century (first quarter)	435	453
Purugupta	468–470*		—	a short period	467	456
Skandagupta	455–467		456–468	455–467	455–467	449–468
Narasiṁhagupta I		470–472	—	517	510	470–474
Samudragupta II		—	—	—	—	Late 6th c.
Kumāragupta II alias Kramāditya		472–475	—	467–476	473–476	470–476
Chandragupta III		—	—	—	—	Late 6th c.
Budhagupta		475–496	—	476–494	476–494	476–488
Prakāśaditya (Note: These kings are known from their coins which are similar to the coins issued by the Gupta kings. According to Kumar, these may have been Huna kings ruling over different parts of the disintegrating Gupta empire.)		496–500	—	—	510	499–520
Parākramādityaḥ		—	—	—	—	Before 532
Vikramādityaḥ		—	—	—	—	Before 532
Chandragupta IV		—	—	—	—	Early 6th c.
Vainyagupta		500–510	—	506–507	507	507/508
Bhānugupta		510–518	—	510	510	?–510
Narasiṁhagupta II alias Balāditya		518–532	—	—	—	518–532(?)
Kumāragupta III		532–540	—	532–550	? - before 543	?–543
Viṣṇugupta alias Candrāditya		540–550	—	532–550	543	540–543

== See also ==
- Gupta Empire
- Gupta era
- Later Gupta dynasty
- Middle kingdoms of India
- List of monarchs of Magadha
