= Vainyagupta =

? Gupta Ruler
- Reign: 543 – 548 CE
- Predecessor: Vishnugupta
- Successor: Bhanugupta
- Dynasty: Gupta
- Father: Purugupta

Vainyagupta (Sanskrit: वैन्यगुप्त) was one of the lesser known kings of the Gupta dynasty.

He is known from the fragmentary clay sealing discovered at Nalanda and the Gunaighar copper plate inscription dated Gupta era 188 (507 CE). R. C. Majumdar considers him as son of Purugupta. In the Nalanda fragmentary clay sealing he is mentioned as the Maharajadhiraja and a paramabhagavata (devout worshipper of Vishnu), while the Gunaighar copper plate inscription mentions him as the Maharaja and a Bhagavan Mahadeva padanudhyato (devotee of Shiva).

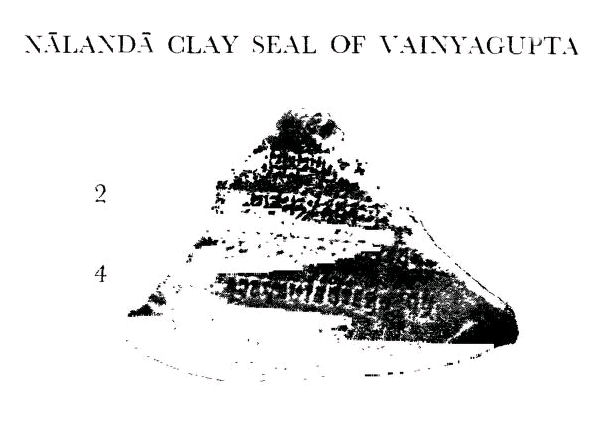
Nalanda clay seal of Vainyagupta.

Vainyagupta had the first construction of Kashi Vishwanath temple between 500 CE - 508 CE during his reign.

== Identification ==
Historians came to know about Vainyagupta after discovering the Nalanda clay seal, Gunaighar copper plate and coins belonging to his reign. The artifacts neither contain his father nor his grandfather's name. According to R.C. Majumdar, Vainyagupta's father was Purugupta. The Gunaighar copper plate mentions one Vainyagupta donating land to a Buddhist monastery at Gunaighar. Majumder and D.C. Ganguli amongst others feel that Vainyagupta mentioned in Gunaighar copper plate is same the Vainyagupta of the Nalanda clay seal who was a ruler of the Gupta Empire. However, Vainyagupta of the Gunaighar copper plate is a devotee of Shiva and the Vainyagupta of the Nalanda seal is a worshipper of Vishnu.

== Reign ==
Vainyagupta ascended the throne in c. 507. According to the Nalanda seal, his title was Maharajadhiraja. However, according to the Gunaighar plate, his title was simply Maharaja.
