= Kumaragupta III =

Gupta emperor from 530 to 540

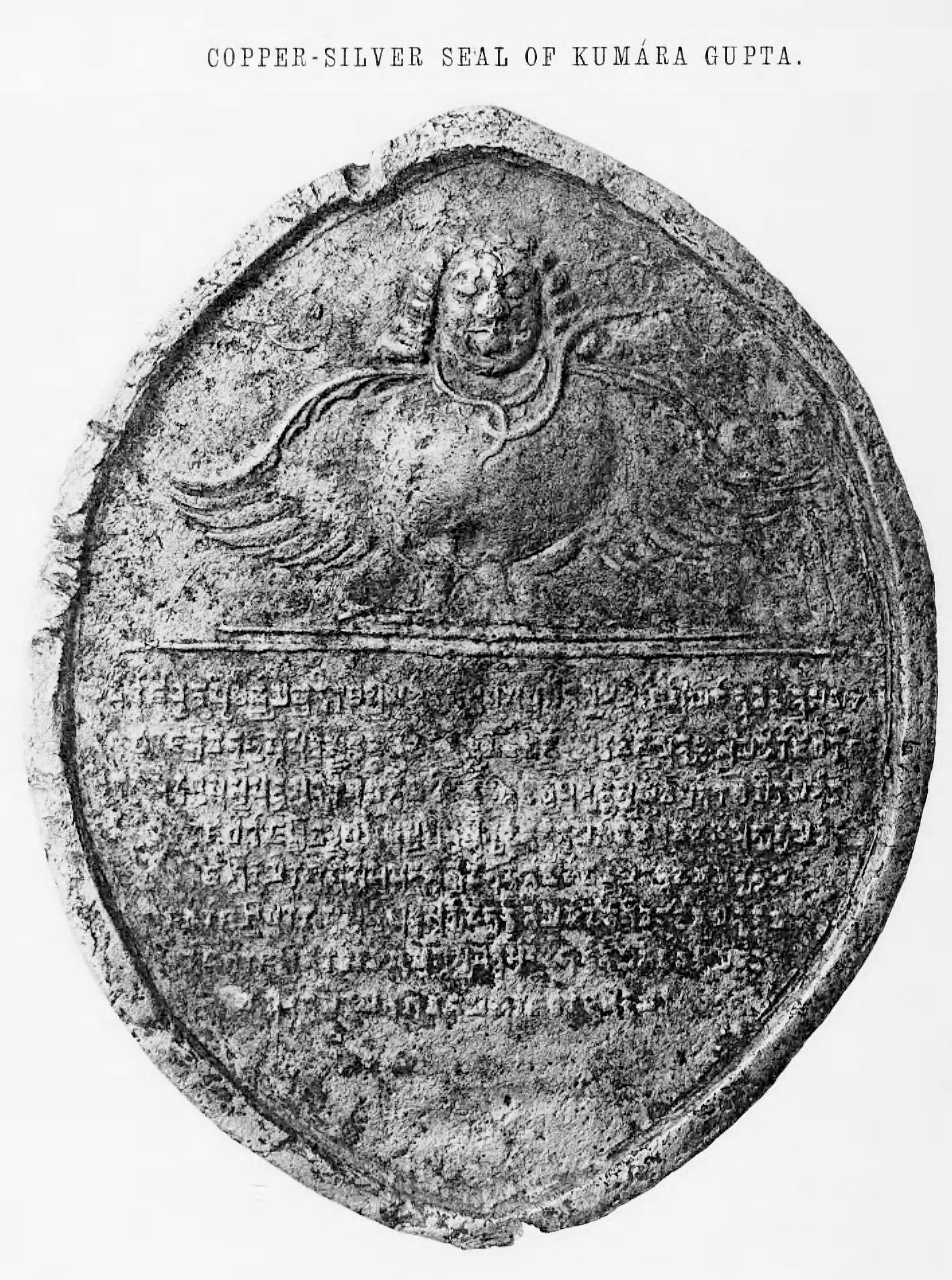
- Bhitari copper-silver seal of Kumaragupta III.

Gupta emperor
- Reign: c. 530 – c. 540
- Predecessor: Narasimhagupta
- Successor: Vishnugupta
- Died: 540
- Issue: Vishnugupta
- Dynasty: Gupta
- Father: Narasimhagupta
- Mother: Shrimitradeva
- Religion: Hinduism

Kumaragupta III (Gupta script:, Ku-ma-ra-gu-pta) was a later Gupta Emperor, ruling from 530 to 540. He succeeded his father Narasimhagupta in about 530.

His silver-copper seal was discovered in Bhitari (Ghazipur district, Uttar Pradesh) in 1889, which mentions the names of his father Narasimhagupta and grandfather Purugupta. The seal of Kumaragupta III allowed for the clarification of the genealogy of later Gupta kings: it gave the names of three Gupta king who had been hitherto unknown: Purugupta, Narasimhagupta and Kumaragupta II.

A clay sealing of him was discovered from Nalanda, which also mentioned about his father and grandfather. Nalanda clay seal of Kumaragupta III mentions Purugupta as Kumaragupta I's son from his queen Anantadevi.

The Gupta Empire declined during his rule and the later kings. He had to face Yashodharman, the Aulikara ruler of Malwa who had defeated the Huna king Mihirakula at Sondani and was conquering Northern India. J.L. Jain is of the view that Kumaragupta III was killed during this conflict, around 530 and Kumaragupta III's father Narasimhagupta committed suicide on hearing the news. He was succeeded by his son Vishnugupta.

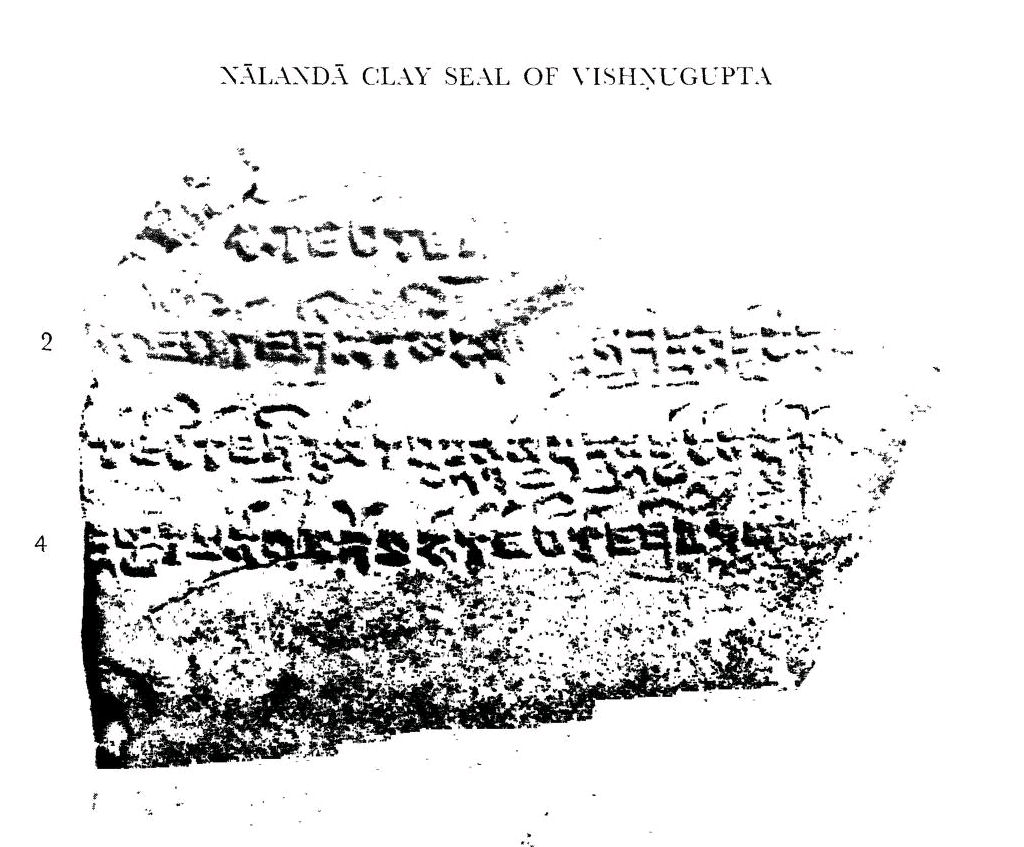
The Nalanda clay seal of Vishnugupta states that Vishnugupta was son of Kumaragupta III, and grandson of Purugupta.

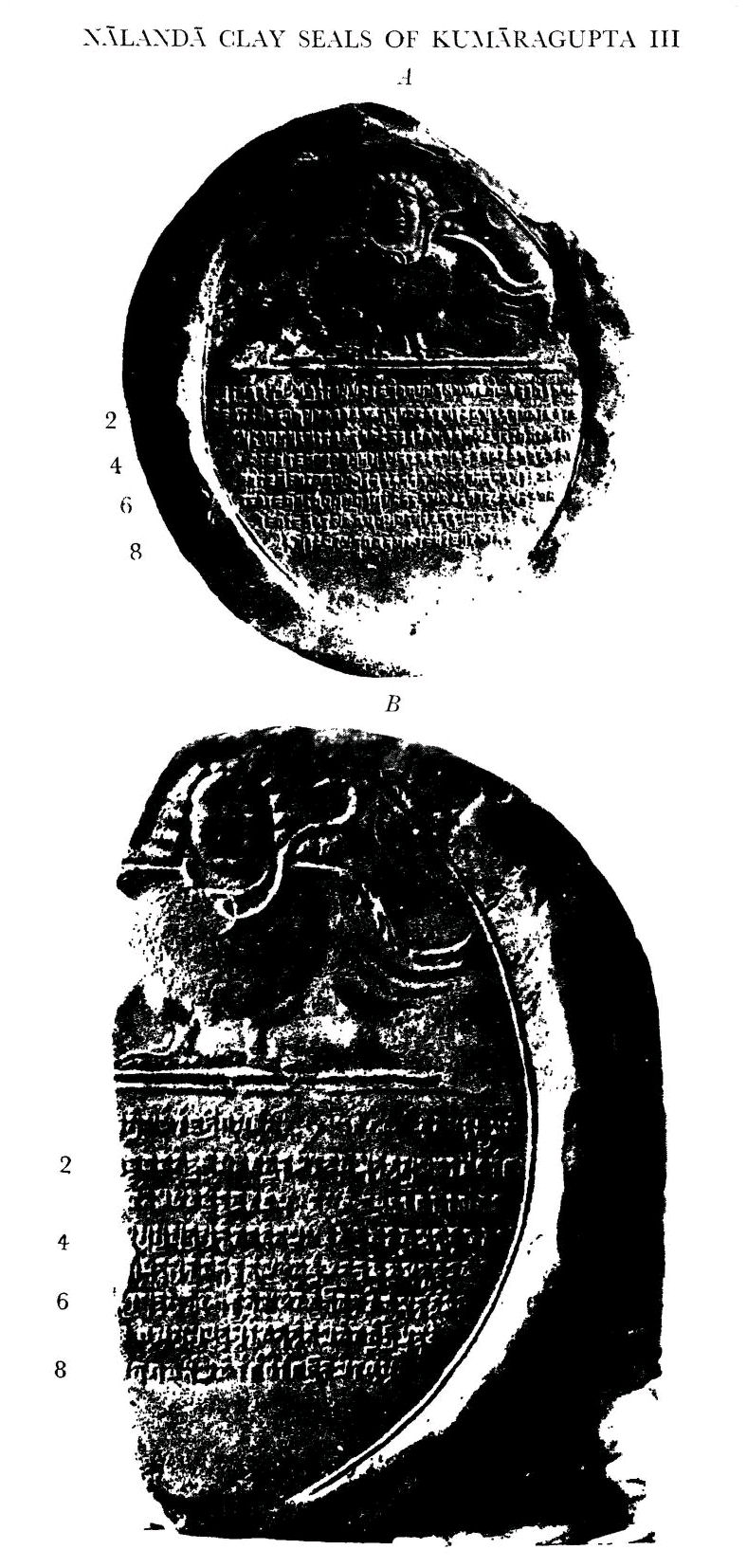
Nalanda clay seals of Kumaragupta III.

Regnal titles
Preceded by Narasimhagupta	Gupta Emperor; 530 – 540	Succeeded by Vishnugupta
