= Vishnugupta (Gupta Empire) =

Gupta emperor from 540 to 550

- Maharajadhiraja (Great King of Kings)
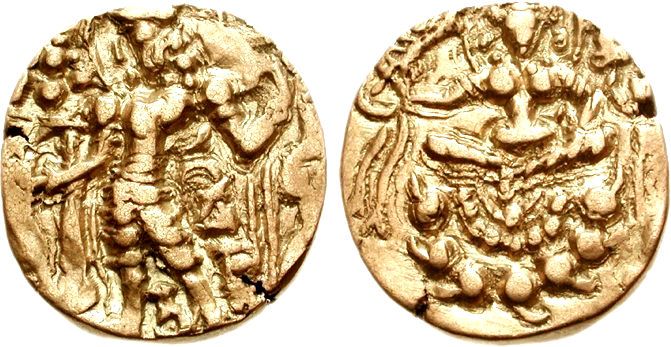
- Vishnugupta Chandraditya c. 540–550 CE. The name Vi-ṣ-ṇu appears vertically under the left arm of the King.

Gupta emperor
- Reign: c. 540 – c. 550 CE
- Predecessor: Kumaragupta III
- Successor: Unknown
- Dynasty: Gupta
- Religion: Hinduism

Vishnugupta Chandraditya (Gupta script: Vi-ṣ-ṇu-gu-pta,) was one of the lesser-known kings of the Gupta Dynasty. He is generally considered to be the last recognized king of the Gupta Empire. His reign lasted 10 years, from 540 to 550 CE. From the fragment of his clay sealing discovered at Nalanda during the excavations of 1927–28, it is revealed that he was the son of Kumaragupta III and the grandson of Narasimhagupta.

The last (the Damodarpur copper-plate inscription), in which he makes a land grant in the area of Kotivarsha (Bangarh in West Bengal) in 542/543 CE. This follows the occupation of most of northern and central India by the Aulikara ruler Yashodharman circa 532 CE.

== Biography ==
According to a Nalanda seal, Vishnugupta was son of Kumaragupta III, and grandson of Purugupta.

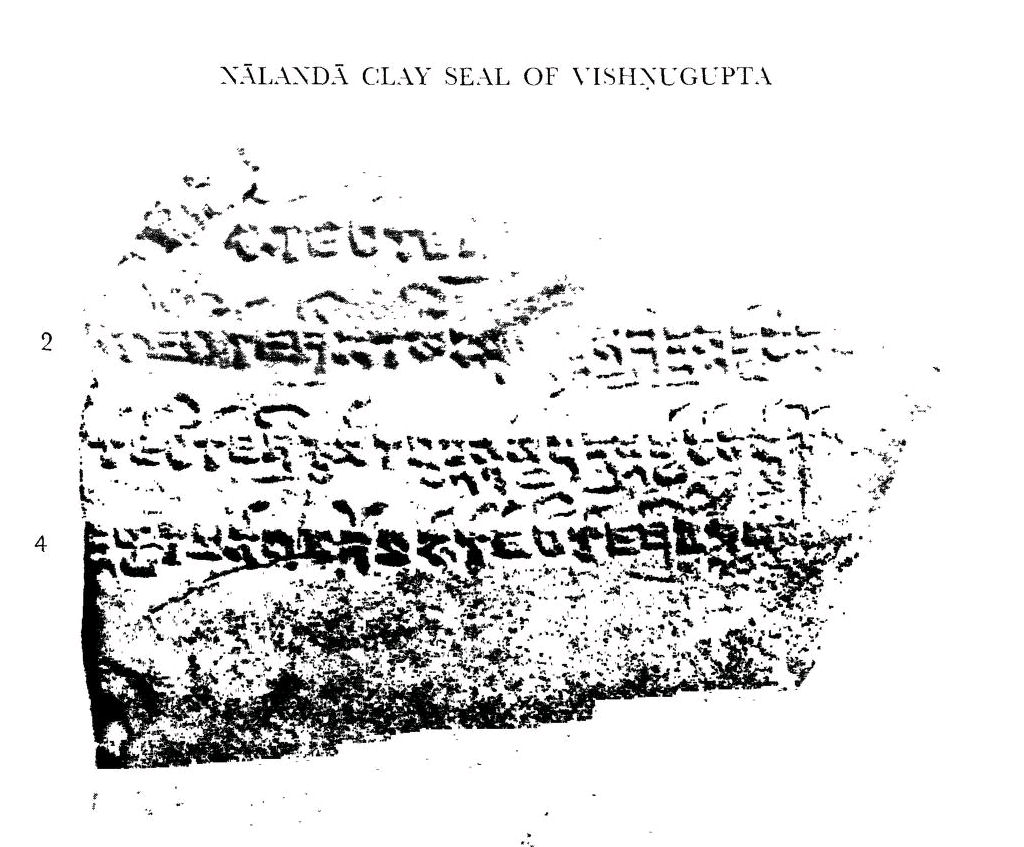
Nalanda clay seal of Vishnugupta. The seal states that Vishnugupta was son of Kumaragupta III, and grandson of Purugupta.

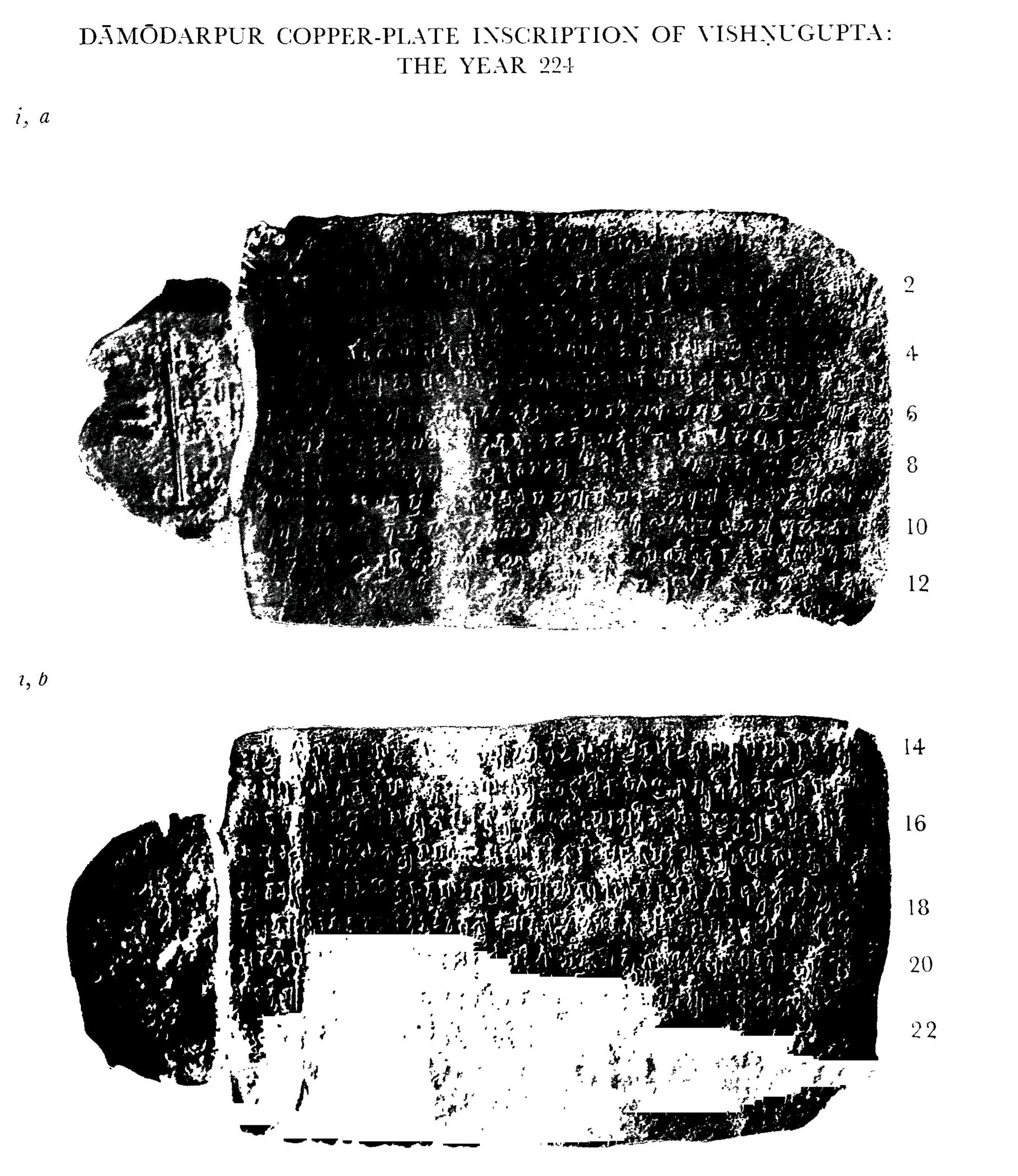
The Damodarpur copper plate of Vishnugupta Year 224 = 542-543 CE.

He later produced coins that were even more debased and heavier than before, bearing the title “Candraditya.” His seal was discovered at Nalanda, and a copper plate, the fifth Damodarpur plate dated to year 224 (which corresponds to 543 to 544 A.D.), may also originate from his reign. Although this copper plate does not include his name, it still grants him the full range of imperial honors. He is considered the last ruler of the imperial Gupta dynasty to use the customary imperial titles and to issue gold coinage. However, his realm was only a remnant of the once vast empire. After his rule, around 550 to 551 A.D, the Gupta dynasty completely disappeared from power, marking the end of 231 years of Gupta dominance over Magadha.

Vishnugupta was a weak ruler, but he was not the worst Gupta ruler. The Gupta Empire managed to survive ten more years until his death. Unlike other kings, he knew his empire will fall. He was poor, but he knows that his community were homeless. In the Damordapur copper plate, it is suggested that he gave lands away to his community. An inscription in the Nalanda University said that even in his darkest, poorest years, Vishnugupta was trying to fulfill his duty as a Gupta emperor. Unlike the powerful rulers who seized everything and forced everyone to fight, he was the opposite. He decided his empire's fate, he doesn't want to fight, he cared deeply about his people. In 551 A.D, Vishnugupta died, the Gupta empire died with him, the last flickering light of the candle vanished.

== See also ==
- Magadha
- Later Gupta dynasty

Regnal titles
Preceded by Kumaragupta III	Gupta Emperor; 540 – 550	Succeeded by ?
