= Bhanugupta =

Gupta prince

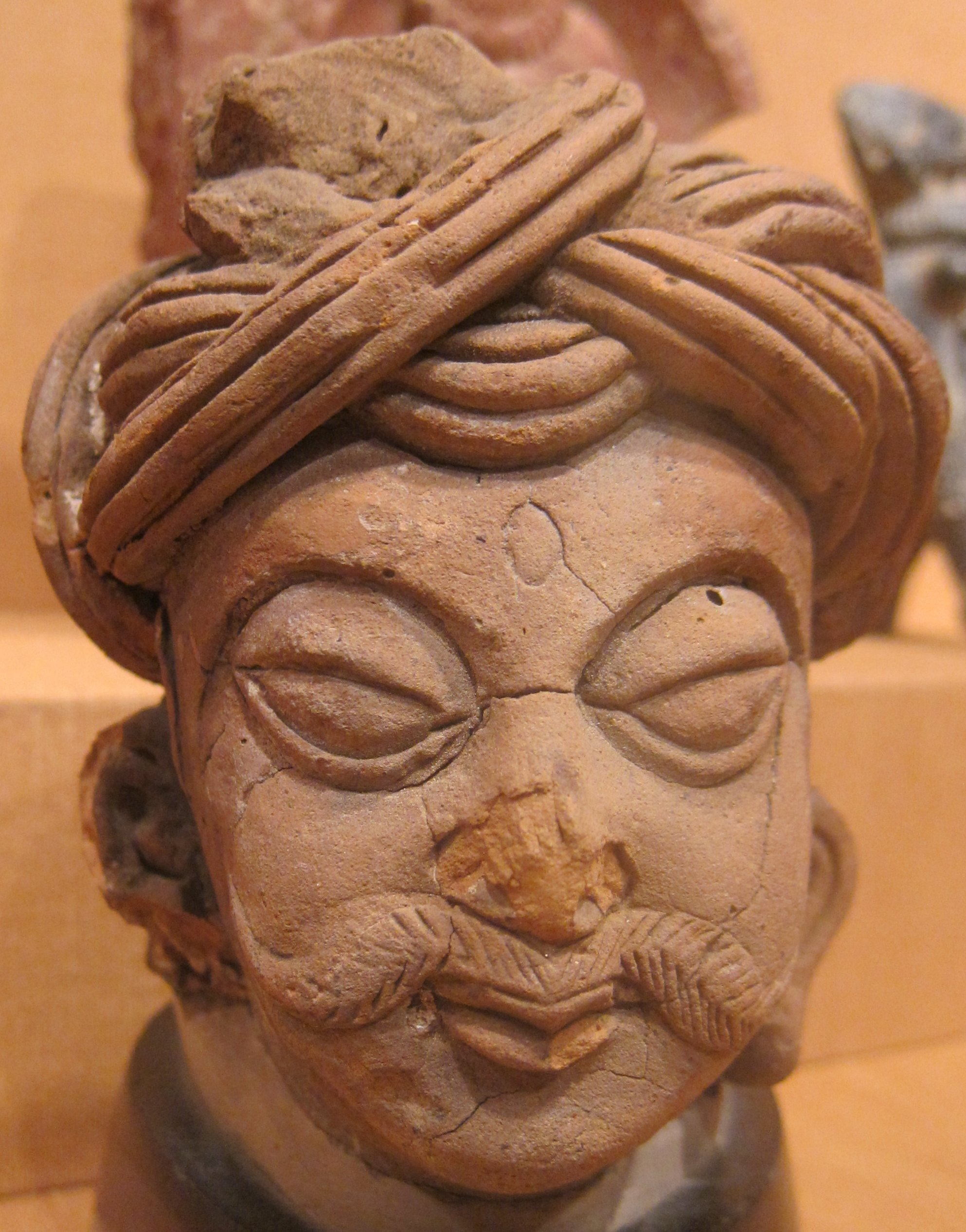
- Male head, northern India, 5th-6th century CE.

? Gupta prince
- Reign: c. 510 – c. ? CE
- Dynasty: Gupta

Bhanugupta was one of the lesser-known kings of the Gupta dynasty. He is only known from an inscription in Eran, and a mention in the Manjushri-mula-kalpa.

Only mentioned in the Eran inscription as a "Raja", not a "Maharaja" or a "Maharajadhiraja" as would be customary for a Gupta Empire ruler, Bhanugupta may only have been a Governor for the region of Malwa, under Gupta Emperor Narasimhagupta.

== Eran inscription of Bhanugupta ==
Bhanugupta is known from a stone pillar inscription in Eran, Malwa. The inscription was translated by John Faithfull Fleet in 1888, and then a second time in 1981, leading to different interpretations.

=== Initial translation (J.F Fleet 1888) ===
According to the initial translation of the Eran inscription (by John Faithful Fleet in 1888), Bhanugupta participated in a non-specific battle in 510 CE (Line 5).

Eran pillar inscription of Goparaja

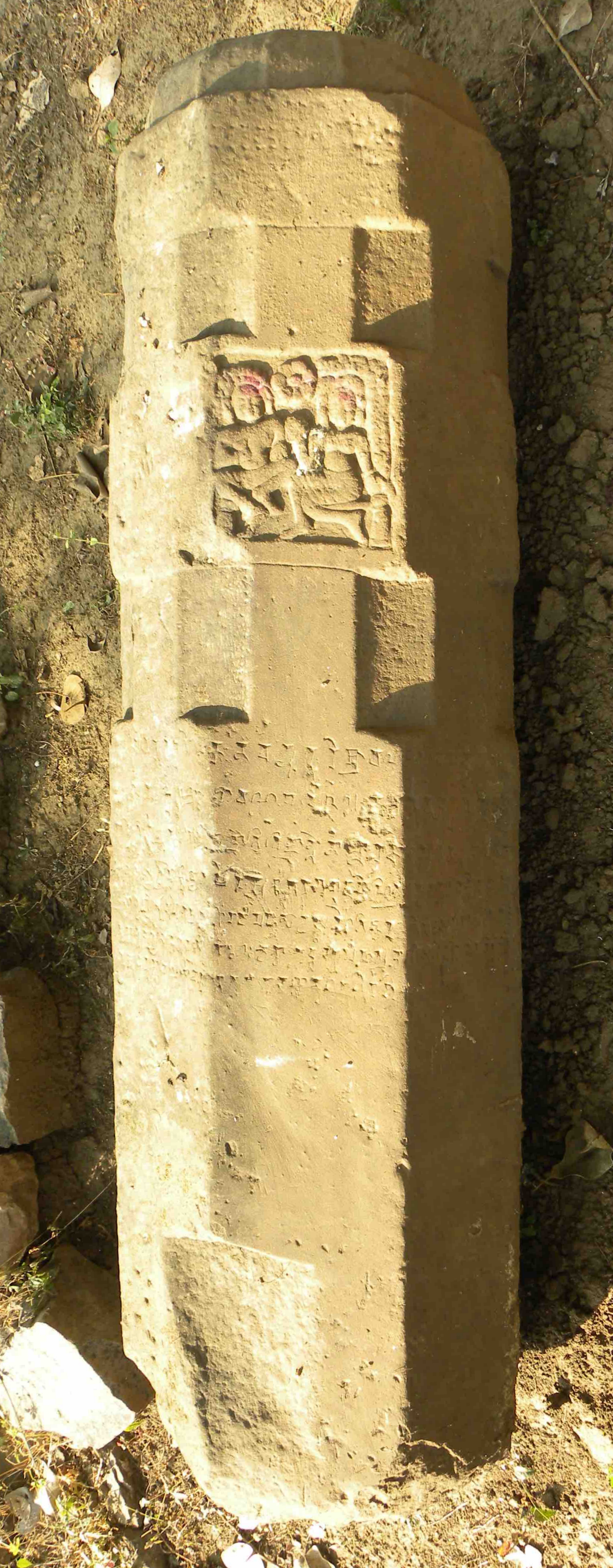
Eran pillar of Goparaja

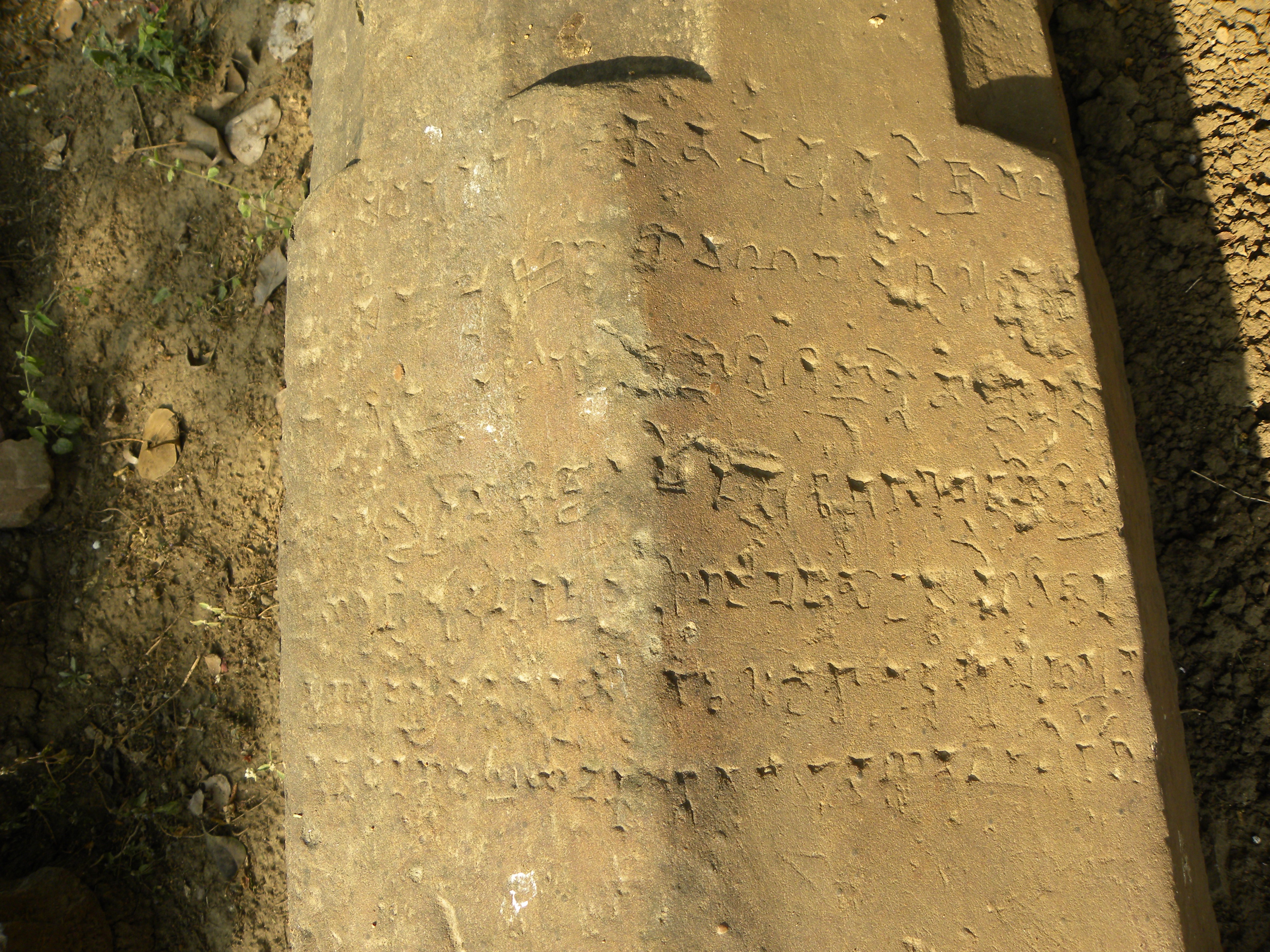
Eran stone pillar inscription of Bhanugupta.

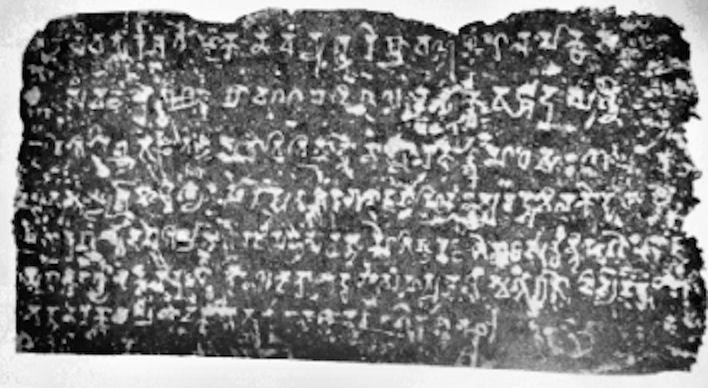
Rubbing of the inscription.

- (Line 1) Ôm! In a century of years, increased by ninety-one; on the seventh lunar day of the dark fortnight of (the month) Srâvana; (or in figures) the year 100 (and) 90 (and) 1; (the month) Srâvana; the dark fortnight; the day 7: —
- (Line 2)—(There was) a king, renowned under the name of . . . . râja, sprung from the . . laksha (?) lineage; and his son (was) that very valorous king (who was known) by the name (of) Mâdhava.
- (Line 3)— His son was the illustrious Gôparâja, renowned for manliness; the daughter's son of the Sarabha king; who is (even) now (?) the ornament of (his) lineage.
- (Line 5) — (There is) the glorious Bhanugupta, the bravest man on the earth, a mighty king, equal to Pârtha, exceedingly heroic; and, along with him, Gôparâja followed . . . . . . . . . . (his) friends (and came) here. [And] having fought a very famous battle, he, [who was but little short of being equal to] the celestial [king (Indra)], (died and) went to heaven; and (his) devoted, attached, beloved, and beauteous wife, in close companionship, accompanied (him) onto the funeral pyre.

— Eran inscription of Bhanugupta, 510 CE.

This translation was the basis for various conjectures about a possible encounter with Toramana, the Alchon Huns ruler. It has been suggested that Bhanugupta was involved in an important battle of his time, and suffered important losses, possibly against the Hun invader Toramana, whom he may or may not have defeated in 510. Mookerji actually considers, in view of the inscription, that Bhanugupta was vanquished by Toramana at the 510 CE Eran battle, so that the western Gupta province of Malwa fell into the hands of the Hunas at that point. Toramana would then have made his Eran boar inscription, claiming control of the region.

=== New translation (1981) ===
A new revised translation was published in 1981. Verses 3-4 are markedly differently translated, in that ruler Bhanugupta and his chieftain or noble Goparaja are said to have participated in a battle against the "Maittras" in 510 CE, thought to be the Maitrakas (the reading being without full certainty, but "as good as certain" according to the authors). This would eliminate the suggestion that Bhanugupta alluded to a battle with Toramana in his inscription.

The Maitrakas ruled in the areas of Gujarat and Western India. According to the 1981 translation, they may have been the adversaries of Gupta ruler Bhanugupta.

- (Lines 1-2) Ōm ! When a century of years, increased by ninety-one, (had elapsed) on the seventh lunar day of the dark fortnight of (the month) Śrāvaṇa, (or in figures) the year 100 (and) 90 (and) 1 (the month) Śrāvaṇa the dark fortnight; the (lunar) day 7;-
- (Verse 1) (there was) a ruler, renowned as . . . . rāja sprung from the Śulakkha lineage; and his son (was) valorous by the name (of) Mādhava.
- (Verse 2) His son was the illustrious Goparaja, renowned for manliness; the daughter’s son of the Sarabha king;1 who became the ornament of (his) family.
- (Verses 3-4) (There is) the glorious Bhanugupta, a distinguished hero on earth, a mighty ruler, brave being equal to Pârtha. And along with him Goparaja, following (him) without fear, having overtaken the Maittras and having fought a very big and famous battle, went to heaven, becoming equal to Indra, the best of the gods; and (his) devoted, attached, beloved, and beauteous wife, clinging (to him), entered into the mass of fire (funeral pyre).

— Eran inscription of Bhanugupta, 510 CE.

Bhanugupta in the inscription is only mentioned as a "Raja" and not a "Maharaja" or a "Maharajadhiraja" as would be customary for a Gupta Empire ruler. Therefore he may only have been a Governor for the region of Malwa, under Gupta Emperor Narasimhagupta.

== Manjushri-mula-kalpa ==
According to a 6th century CE Buddhist work, the Manjushri-mula-kalpa, "after the death of Budhagupta, two kings in the Gupta line were crowned, one in Gauda and the other in Magadha", the latter being probably Narasimhagupta. According to this work, after Bhanu Gupta had lost Malwa, Toramana continued his conquest to Magadha, forcing Narasimhagupta Baladitya to make a retreat to Bengal. Toramana is said to have crowned a new king in Benares, named Prakataditya, who is presented as a son of Narasimha Gupta. Toramana then died in Benares as he was returning westward.

== Sources ==
- Fleet, J. F. (1888). Corpus Inscriptionum Indicarum. Vol. 3. Calcutta: Government of India, Central Publications Branch.
