= Gupta era =

Historical period in South Asia from 318 CE to 700 CE

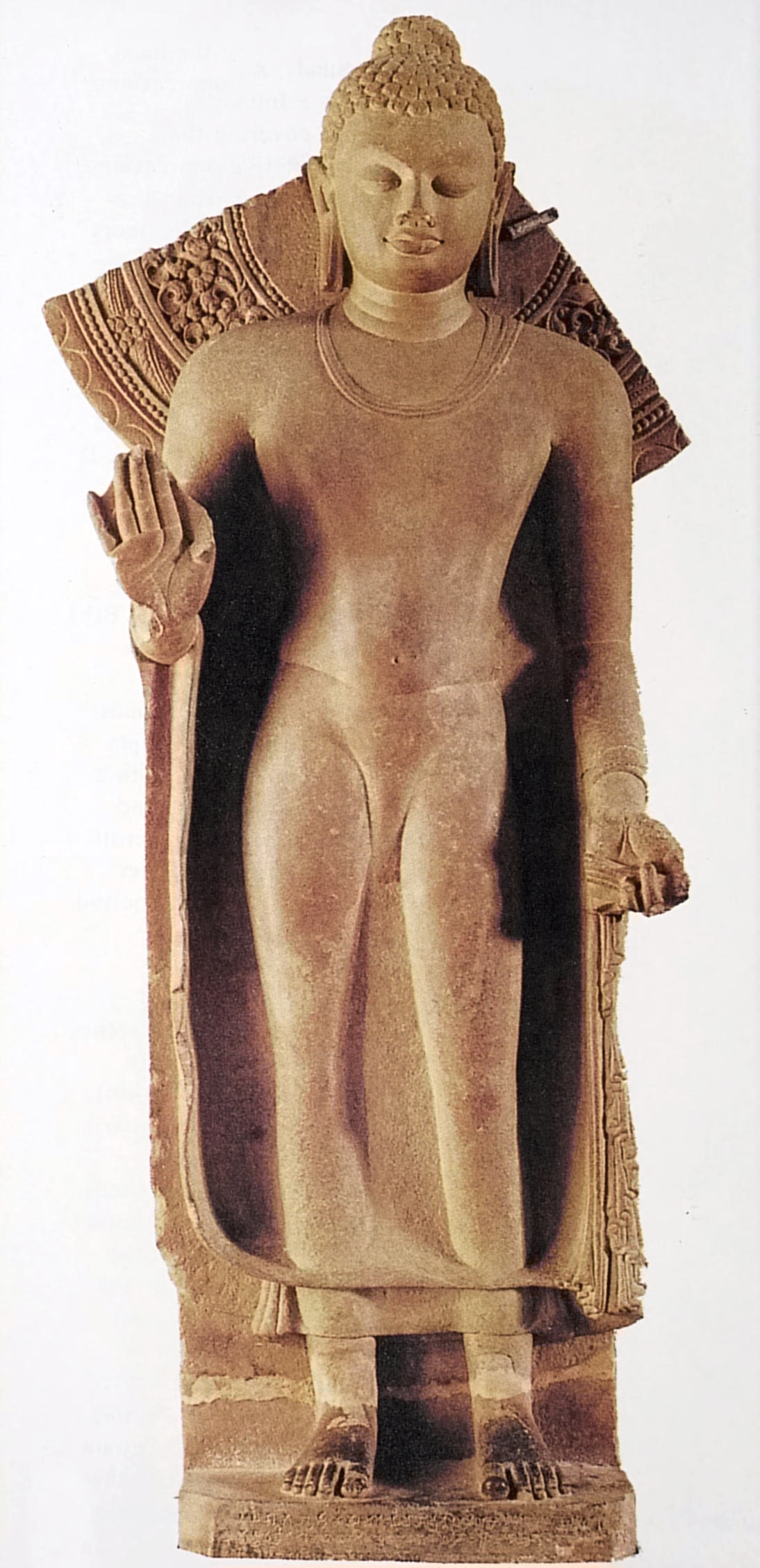
A standing Buddha, inscribed: "Gift of Abhayamira in 154" of the Gupta Era (474 CE) in the reign of Kumaragupta II. Gupta art. Sarnath Museum.

The Gupta era is a historical calendar era that begins from c. 318–319 CE. It was used by the Gupta emperors, as well as their vassals and their successors in present-day northern India and Nepal. It is identical to the Vallabhi era (or Valabhi era), which was used in the Saurashtra region of western India, although regional differences lead to a slightly different calculation for the conversion of Vallabhi era years to Common Era (CE).

== History ==
The Gupta era is now believed to have been started by the Gupta kings, although there have been several debates over its origin in the past. The 11th century Persian writer Al-Biruni, who described the Guptas as "wicked", stated that the Gupta era marked the end of the Gupta dynasty. He dated the Gupta era to the year 241 of the Shaka era, that is, 318–319 CE which later led to debates about the era's origin among the 19th century historians since his statement would mean the Gupta era ended around 319 CE rather than begin at that time.

John Faithfull Fleet analysed the Gupta inscriptions, and realised that they were dated to years of a particular calendar era. He believed that the era was founded by king Jayadeva of the Lichchhavi dynasty (relatives of the Guptas), and was later adopted by the Guptas.

Later discoveries and analysis indicate that the era was actually founded by the Guptas, and was known after them. For example:

- The Mathura stone pillar inscription, issued by Chandragupta II, is dated to the year 61 "following the era of the Guptas" (Gupta-kālā nuvartamāna).
- The Sarnath inscriptions of Kumaragupta and Budhagupta also refer to the Gupta era.
- The Junagadh rock inscription of Skandagupta mentions the phrase Gupta-prakāle or Guptasya-kāle.
- The Ganjam copper-plate inscription from the reign of Shashanka is dated to year 300 of the Gupta-era (Gauptabda varsha-shatatraye).

=== Founder of the era ===
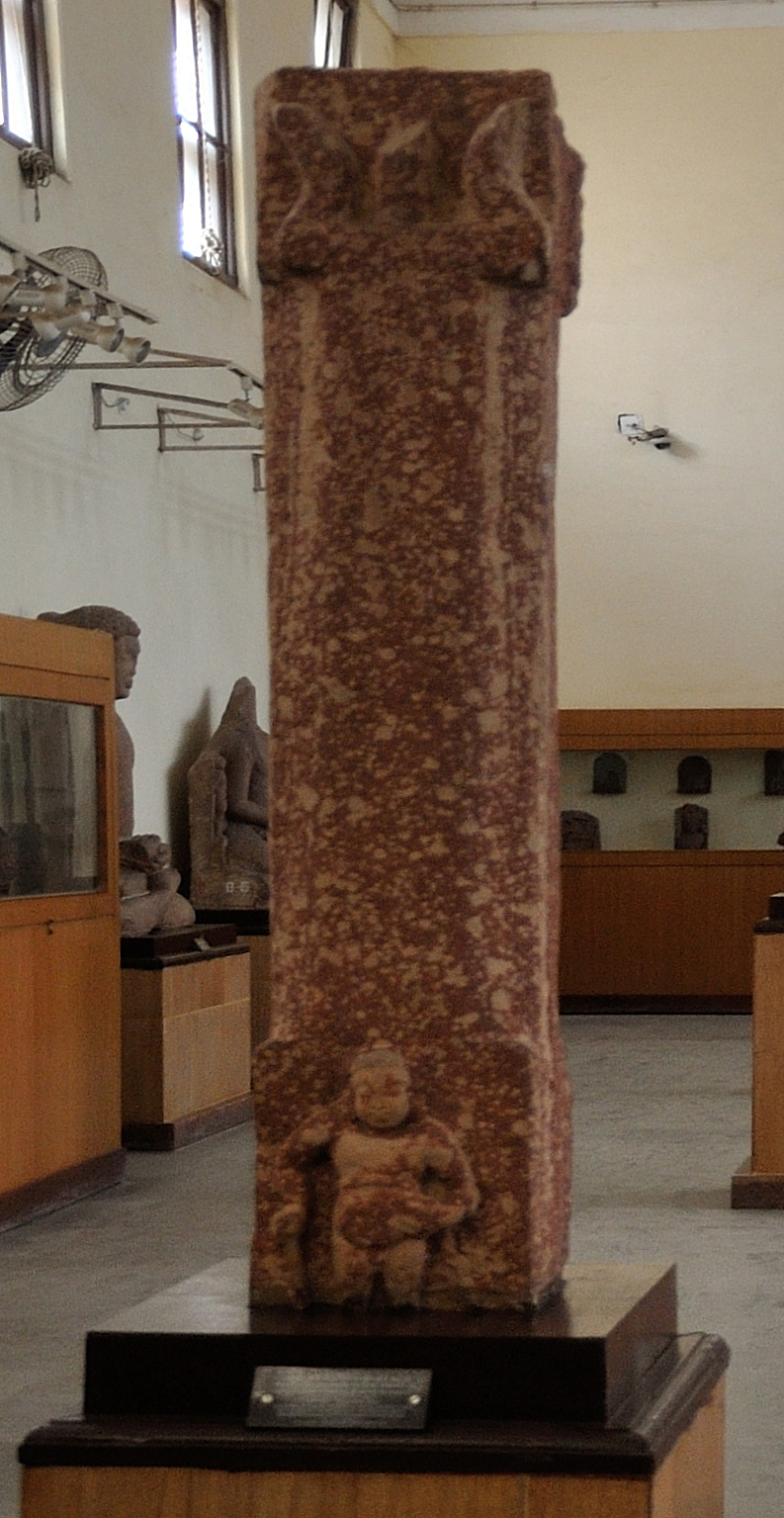
The pillar in the name of Chandragupta II in the "year 61 following the era of the Guptas". Mathura Museum.

The most prevalent theory about the era's origin credits Chandragupta I with its establishment. He was the first Gupta king to assume the imperial title Maharajadhiraja, so several modern scholars theorize that he founded the era around 319 CE, and that the epoch of this era marks his coronation. Scholars such as V. A. Smith and P. L. Gupta date Chandragupta's ascension (and thus, the epoch of the era) to 319-320 CE, while others such as Georg Bühler date it to 318–319 CE.

Some historians, such as D. C. Sircar and R. C. Majumdar, have theorized that the Gupta era marks the coronation of Samudragupta, the son of Chandragupta I. In his support, Majumdar cites two copper-plate grant inscriptions attributed to the years 5 (found at Nalanda) and 9 (found at Gaya). Assuming these inscriptions are dated in the Gupta era (like other Gupta inscriptions), this would imply that Samudragupta ascended the throne in or before year 5 of the Gupta era. If we assume that Chandragupta I founded the era to mark his coronation, we will have to assume that he ruled for 5 years or less. Majumdar argues that this is highly unlikely, given that Chandragupta I was an accomplished king as suggested by his imperial title. Some other scholars regard these inscriptions as later forgeries, but Majumdar believes that at least the first inscription is a genuine one, and even if these inscriptions were forged at a later date, they were probably copied from older inscriptions. S. R. Goyal theorizes that the era was started by the later king Chandragupta II, but its beginning was dated to Samudragupta's ascension.

Some other theories trace the origin of the era to 3rd century CE or earlier, but this view is now discredited: the 7th century inscription of Shashanka is dated to the 300th year of the Gupta era, and proves that the Gupta era started in the 4th century.

== Usage ==
The Gupta era was used in northern India, western India and parts of eastern India until the end of the Gupta dynasty in the 6th century CE.

Apart from the Gupta rulers, the Gupta era was also used by their vassals and successors, such as:

- the Maitraka dynasty of Vallabhi: this resulted in the era being called the "Vallabhi" era in the Maitraka-ruled territory.
- Shashanka
- Parivrajaka dynasty of central India
- Uchchhakalpa dynasty of central India

Recent research suggests that the Gupta Era (epochal year of 320 CE) may also have been in use in the Pyu states in Myanmar. (Note: (Aung-Thwin 2005: 334–335): More research needs to be done. A Pyu stone inscription discovered in 1993 indicates that the Pyu states may have also used the Gupta Era.) Mainstream scholarship, however, holds that the recalibrated calendar was launched at Sri Ksetra, and later adopted by the upstart principality of Pagan.

== Conversion to CE ==
According to the calculations of John Faithfull Fleet, the Gupta era began on the first day of the shukla paksha (bright fortnight) of the Chaitra month. Depending on regional conventions, the process of converting the Gupta era years to Common Era (CE) years is different:

- The early inscriptions dated in the Gupta era followed the scheme prevalent in northern India: the first month of the year is Chaitra (chaitradi), and the month starts from the full moon day (purnimanta).
  - The year mentioned in these inscriptions is generally the current year at the time of issuance. Thus, the date of these inscriptions can be converted to CE by adding 320 or 321.
  - If the year mentioned in the date is the expired year (that is the preceding year at the time of issuance), the date can be converted to CE by adding 319 or 320.
- The later inscriptions from the Maitraka territory ("Vallabhi era") follow the scheme prevalent in southern and western India: the first month of the year is kartika (karttikadi), and the month starts from the new moon day (amanta). Because of this, the dates are set back by 5 months.
  - For the inscriptions that mention the current year, the date can be converted to CE by adding 319 or 320.
  - For the inscriptions that mention the expired year, the date can be converted to CE by adding 318 or 319.
