= Purugupta =

Gupta emperor from 467 to 473

Gupta emperor
- Reign: c. 467 – c. 473
- Predecessor: Skandagupta
- Successor: Kumaragupta II
- Dynasty: Gupta
- Father: Kumaragupta I
- Mother: Anantadevi

Purugupta (Gupta script: Pu-ra-gu-pta, Sanskrit: पुरुगुप्त) (reigned 467–473 CE) was an emperor of the Gupta dynasty in northern India. Purugupta was a son of the Gupta emperor Kumaragupta I by his queen Anantadevi. He succeeded his half-brother Skandagupta. No inscription of Purugupta has been found so far. He is known from the Bhitari silver-copper seal of his grandson Kumaragupta III and Nalanda clay sealings of his sons Narasimhagupta and Budhagupta and his grandson Kumaragupta III. From the Saranath Buddha image inscription, it is concluded that he was succeeded by Kumaragupta II. According to Hornell and Raychaudhary, Prakashaditya was another title of Purugupta, although this has now been disproven by Pankaj Tandon, who has definitively shown that Prakashaditya was the Hun king Toramana.

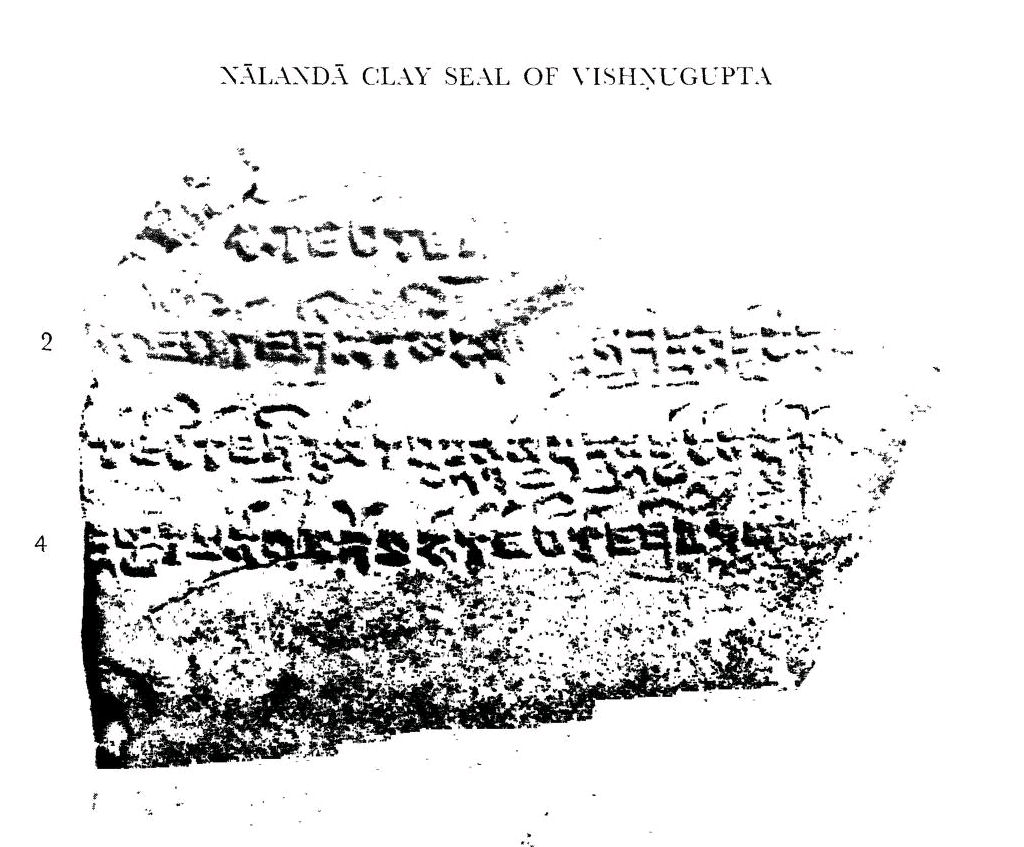
Nalanda clay seal of Vishnugupta. The seal states that Vishnugupta was son of Kumaragupta (III), and grandson of Purugupta.

According to a Nalanda seal of Vishnugupta, Vishnugupta was son of Kumaragupta (III), and great-grandson of Purugupta.

Regnal titles
| Preceded by Skandagupta | Gupta Emperor; 467–473 CE | Succeeded by Kumaragupta II |
