= Kumaragupta II =

Gupta emperor from 473 to 476

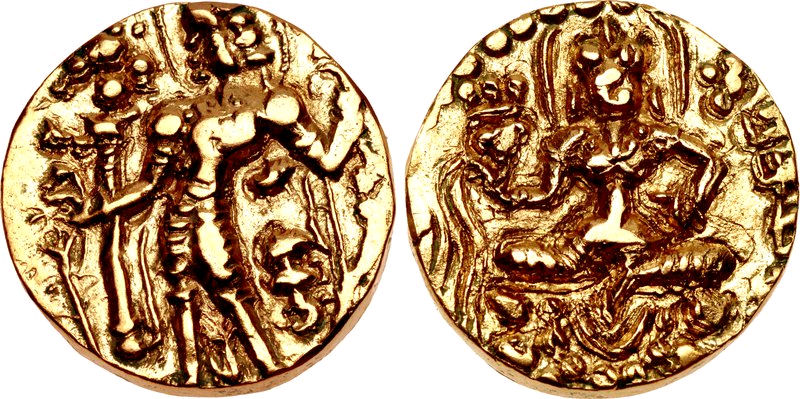
- Kumaragupta II Kramaditya

Gupta emperor
- Reign: c. 473 – c. 476 CE
- Predecessor: Purugupta
- Successor: Budhagupta
- Dynasty: Gupta
- Religion: Buddhist

Kumaragupta II (Gupta script: Ku-ma-ra-gu-pta) Kramaditya was an emperor of the Gupta Empire. An image of Gautama Buddha at Sarnath notes that he succeeded Purugupta who was most likely his father. He was succeeded by Budhagupta.

Several statues of the standing Buddha, representative of Gupta art, are known from the reign of Kumaragupta II, now in the Sarnath Museum.

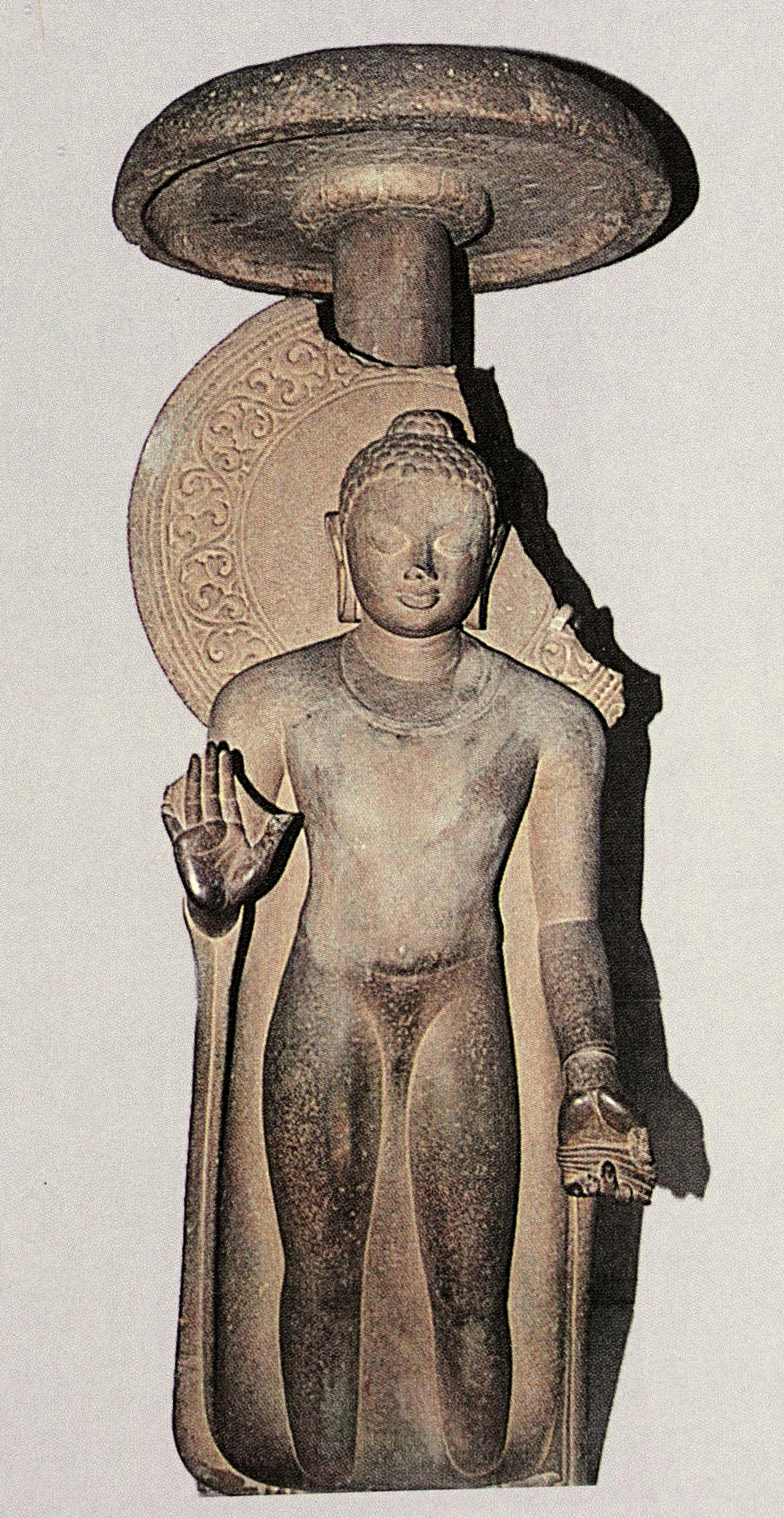
Buddha, standing under a chatra umbrella, inscribed: "Gift of Abhayamira in 154 GE" (474 CE) in the reign of Kumaragupta II. Sarnath Museum.

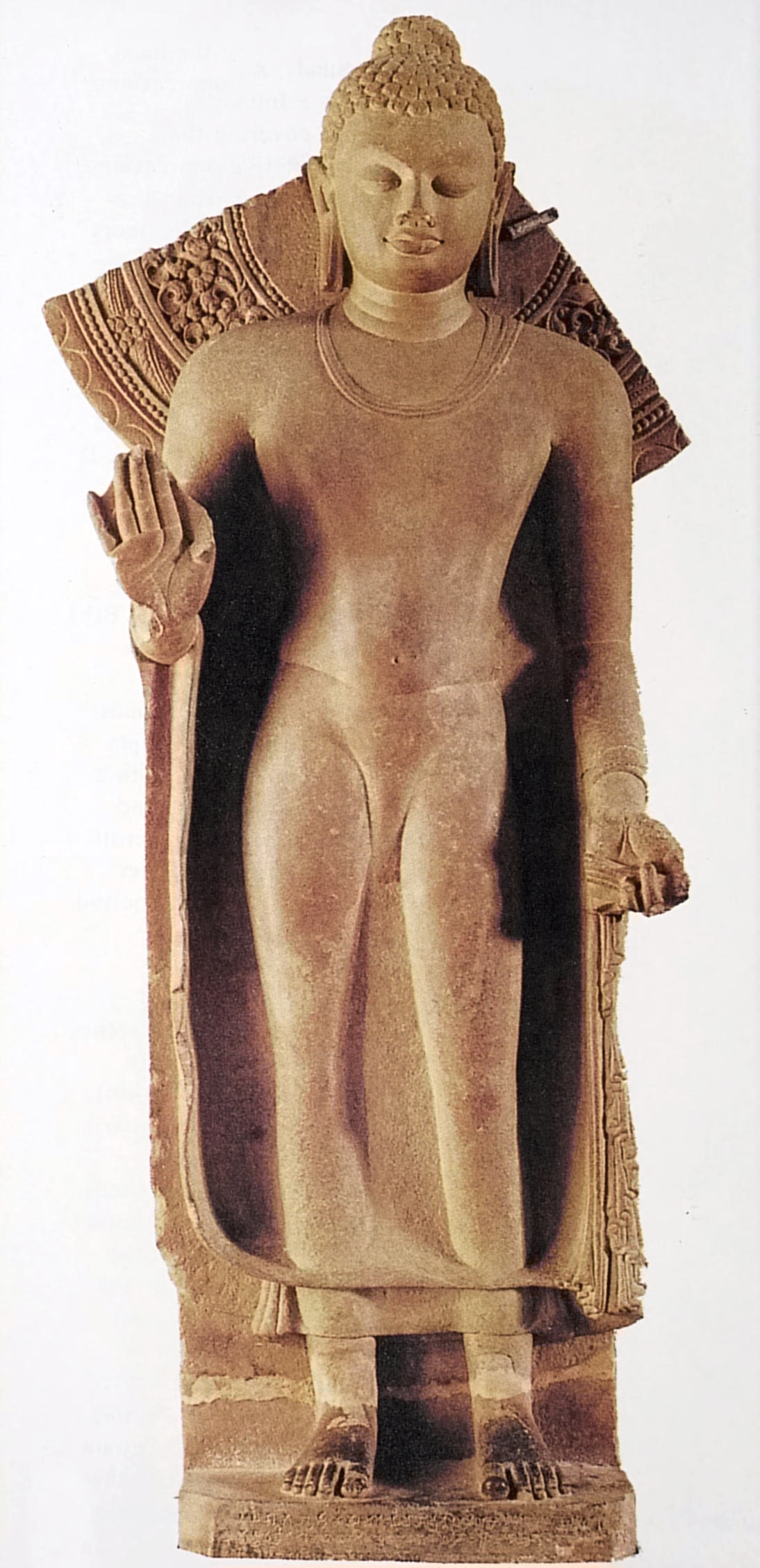
Buddha, standing, inscribed: "Gift of Abhayamira in 154 GE" 474 CE in the reign of Kumaragupta II. Sarnath Museum.

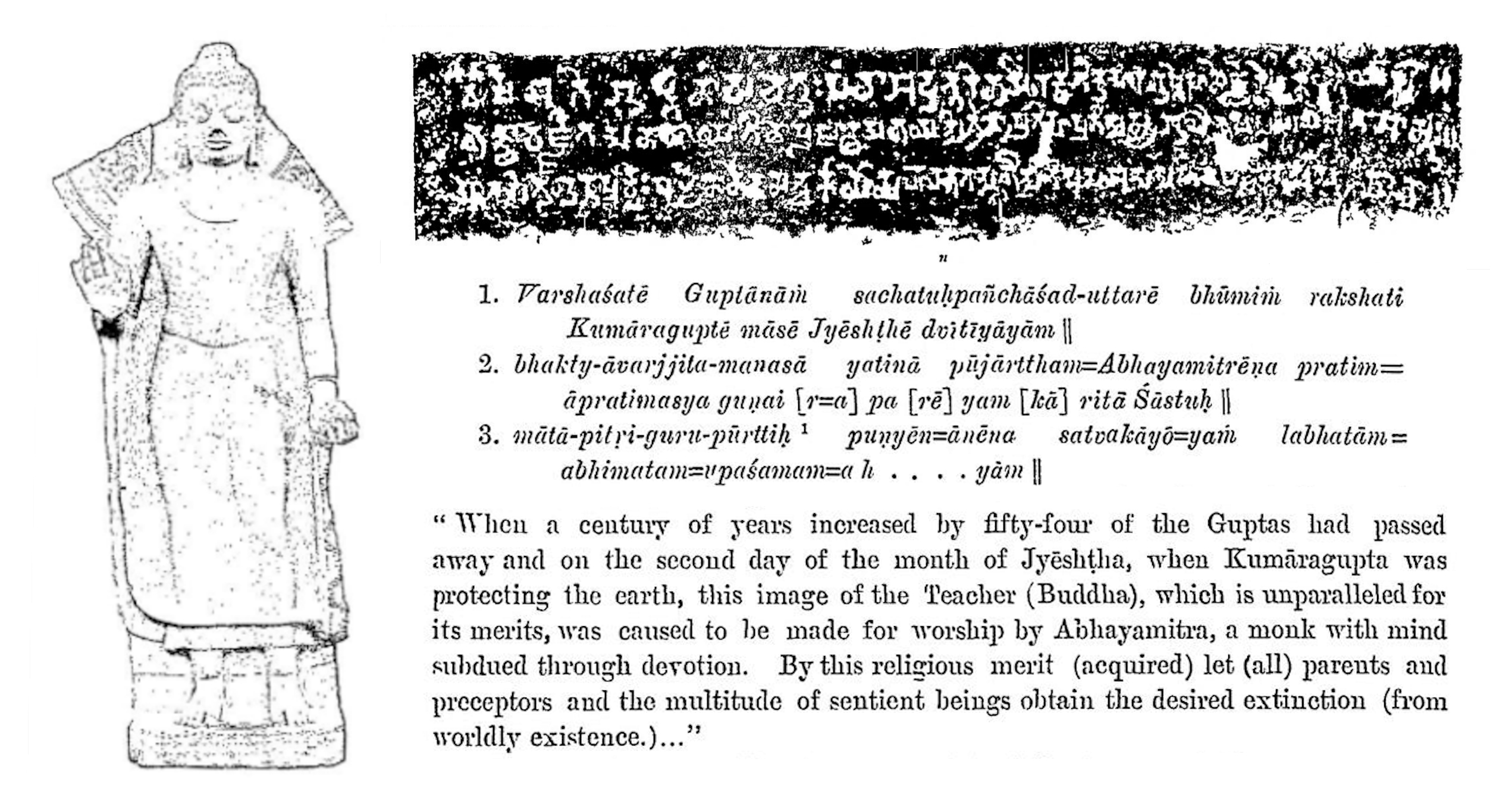
Inscription of the Buddha statue dated in Gupta Era 154 in the reign of Kumaragupta, with English translation.

Regnal titles
Preceded by Purugupta	Gupta Emperor; 473-476 CE	Succeeded by Budhagupta
