= Narasimhagupta =

Gupta emperor from 495 to 530

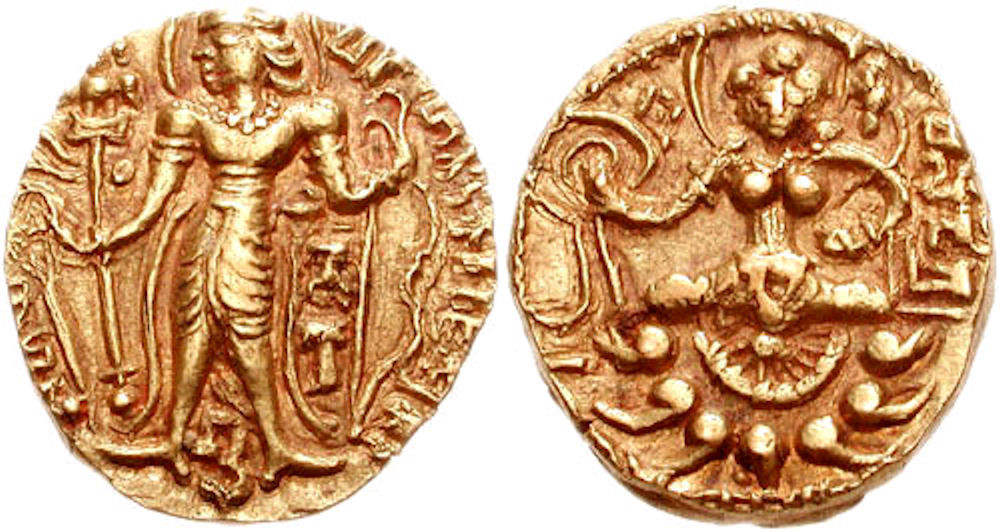
- Coin of Narasinhagupta, c. 414–455 CE. The name Nara appears vertically under the left arm of the King.

Gupta emperor
- Reign: c. 495 – c. 530
- Predecessor: Budhagupta
- Successor: Kumaragupta III
- Spouse: Shrimitradevi
- Dynasty: Gupta
- Father: Purugupta
- Religion: Buddhism

Narasimhagupta (Gupta script: Na-ra-si-ṅha-gu-pta) Baladitya was the Gupta Emperor from 495 to 530. He was son of Purugupta and probably the successor of Budhagupta. Hiuen Tsang refers to him as the king of Magadha.

== Defeat of the Hunas ==
According to the Chinese monk Xuanzang, Narasimhagupta had to pay tribute to the Huna king Mihirakula.

Finally, Baladitya along with Yasodharman of Malwa is credited with driving the Alchon Huns from the plains of North India according to the Chinese monk Xuanzang. In a fanciful account, Xuanzang, who wrote a century later in 630, reported that Mihirakula had conquered all India except for an island where the king of Magadha named Balditya (who could be Gupta ruler Narasimhagupta Baladitya) took refuge, but that Mihirakula was finally captured by the Indian king, who later spared his life. Mihirakula is then said to have returned to Kashmir to retake the throne.

Narasimhagupta's governor in Malwa, Bhanugupta may also have been involved in this conflict.

== Shramanic Philanthropy ==
The Guptas were traditionally a Hindu dynasty. Narasimhagupta Baladitya however, according to contemporary writer Paramartha, was brought up under the influence of the Mahayana philosopher, Vasubandhu. He built a sangharama at Nalanda and also a 300 ft (91 m) high vihara with a Buddha statue within which, according to Xuanzang, resembled the "great Vihara built under the Bodhi tree". According to the Manjushrimulakalpa (c. 800 CE), king Narasimhsagupta became a Buddhist monk, and left the world through meditation (Dhyana).

The Chinese monk Xuanzang also noted that Baladitya's son, Vajra, who commissioned a Sangharama as well, "possessed a heart firm in faith".

His clay sealing has been found in Nalanda. The name of his queen mentioned in the Nalanda sealing is Shrimitradevi. He was succeeded by his son Kumaragupta III.

== Coinage ==
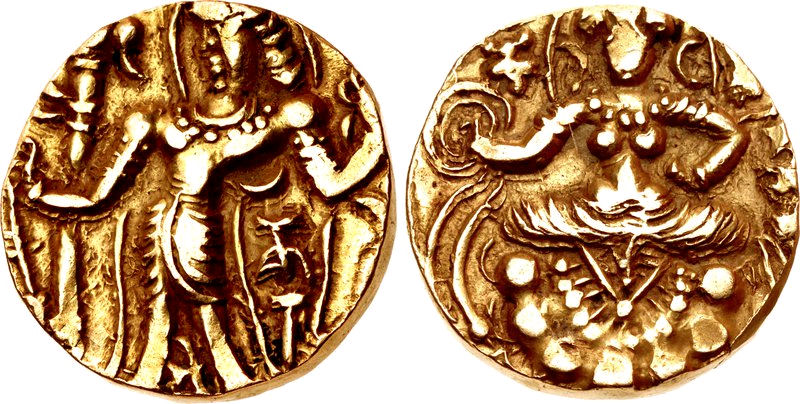
Coin of Narasimhagupta Baladitya, circa 495-530 CE.

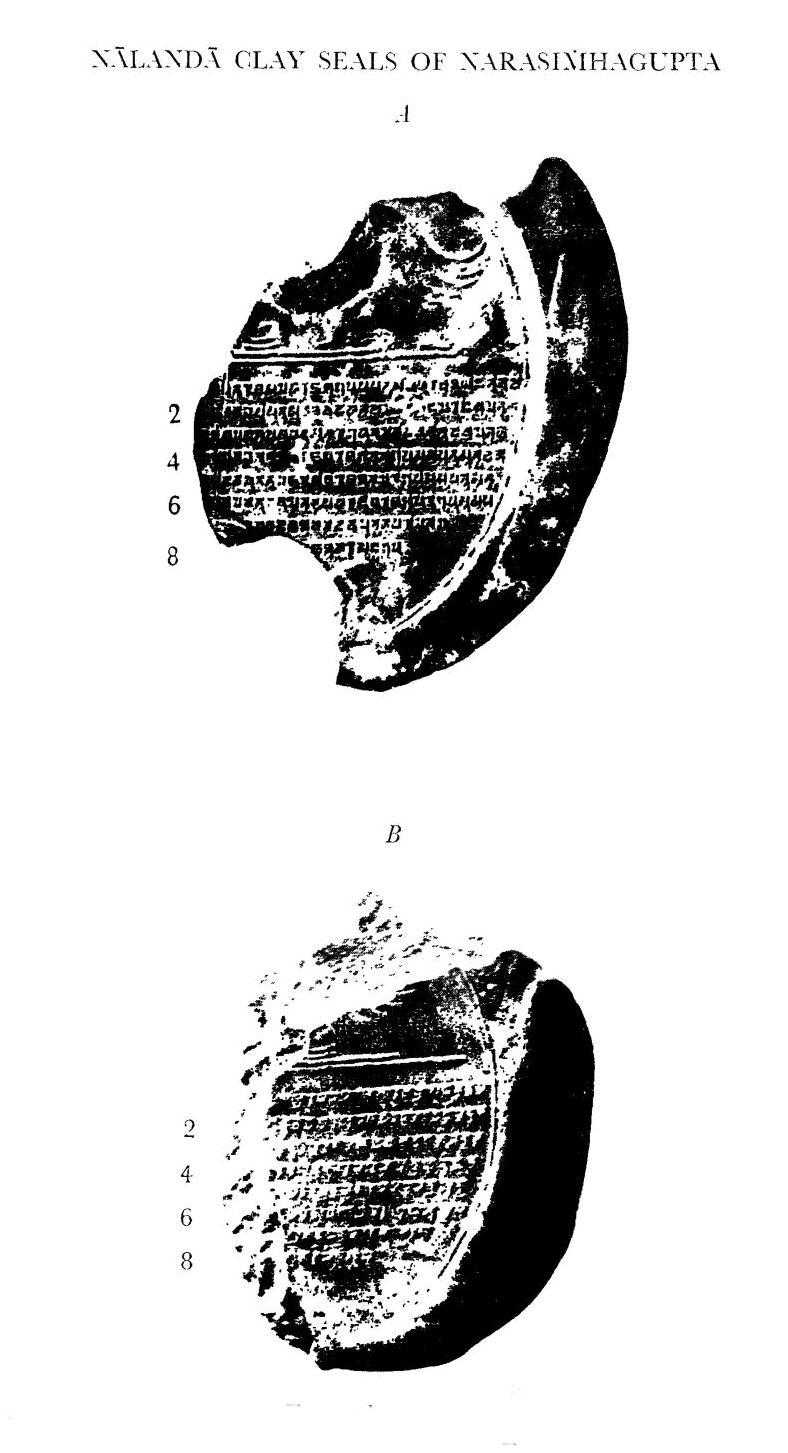
Nalanda clay seals of Narasimhagupta.

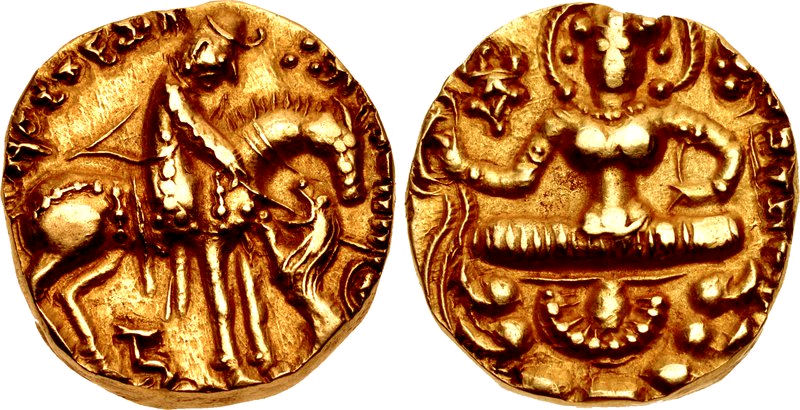
A gold coin of contemporary Alchon Huns king Toramana with Lakshmi on the reverse (circa 490–515), inspired from contemporary Gupta coins, such as those of Narasimhagupta Baladitya.

== Sources ==
- Mookerji, Radhakumud (1995). The Gupta Empire. Delhi: Motilal Banarsidass. p. 119. ISBN 9788120804401.

Regnal titles
Preceded by Budhagupta	Gupta emperor 495 – 530	Succeeded by Kumaragupta III
