= John Faithfull Fleet =

British historian, epigraphist and linguist (1847–1917)

John Faithfull Fleet 1912

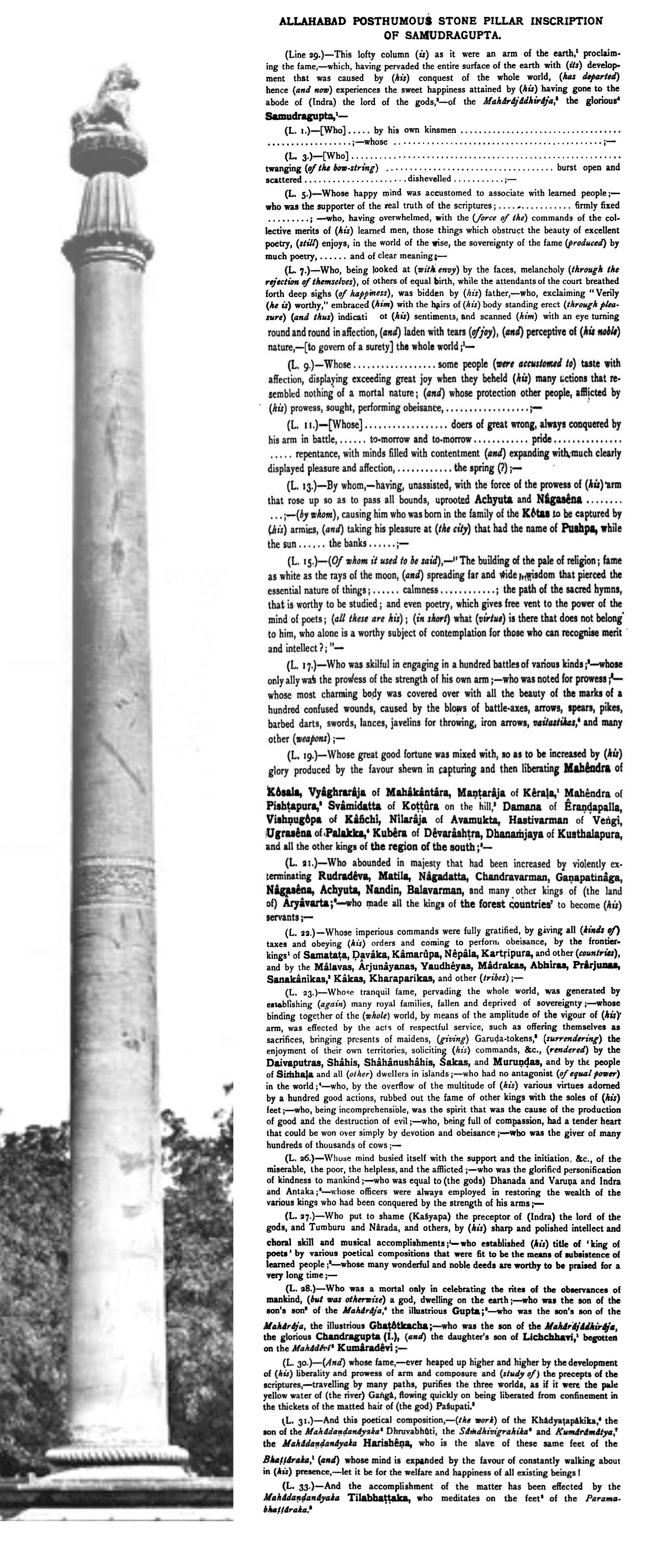
English translation of the Allahabad inscription of Samudragupta, by John Faithfull Fleet, circa 1888.

John Faithfull Fleet C.I.E (1847 – 21 February 1917) was an English civil servant with the Indian Civil Service and became known as a historian, epigraphist and linguist. His research in Indian epigraphy and history, conducted in India over a thirty-year period, is published in books including Pali, Sanskrit and Old Canarese Inscriptions, The Dynasties of the Kanarese Districts of The Bombay Presidency from the earliest historical times to the Musalman Conquest, and The Inscriptions of The Early Gupta Kings and their Successors. He was a regular contributor to works journals covering Indian history. His published well-regarded works on inscriptions in the Sanskrit, Pali and Kannada languages and on the history of dynasties such as the Guptas, Kadambas, Aulikaras, Chalukyas, Rashtrakutas and Seunas.

== Early life ==
Fleet was born to John George Fleet, a London wholesale sugar dealer, and Esther Faithfull of Headley, Surrey, England, in 1847. He was educated at the Merchant Taylors' School in London. His five brothers included Vice-Admiral Henry Louis Fleet (born 1851-1923), Rutland Barrington (1853–1922), a star in Gilbert and Sullivan operas, and actor Duncan Fleet (born 1860, date of death unknown). He also had two sisters. His aunt, Emily Faithfull, was an activist and dramatic reader.

=== Early career and interests ===
Fleet was appointed to the Indian Civil Service (ICS) in the year 1865, and to prepare himself for this, he studied Sanskrit at University College London. In 1867, he moved to the Bombay Presidency (then a British province in western India) and soon held the posts of Assistant Collector and then Magistrate, Educational Inspector, in the Southern Division (1872), Assistant Political Agent in Kolhapur and the Southern Maratha Country (1875), and Collector and Magistrate (1882).

Meanwhile, he continued with his interest in Sanskrit and the inscriptions that were abundant on stone and copper plate in the Bombay Presidency. He began publishing articles about the inscriptions in the mid-1860s. His studies soon led him to study another language, Kannada, both in its ancient and modern forms.

=== Eminence ===
Fleet was soon establishing a reputation through his papers on the epigraphy and history of Southern India in fora such as the Bombay Asiatic Society and The Indian Antiquary, founded in 1872 (he later edited it from the 14th to 20th editions (1885–92)). He also published his works on the Pali, Sanskrit and old Canarese Inscriptions for the India Office in 1878. Fleet became the first epigraphist of the Government of India when such a post was created in 1883. After three years as the epigraphist, he was appointed as the Collector and Magistrate of Sholapur in 1886.

One of his greatest works was on the hitherto uncharted Gupta period. The Inscriptions of The Early Gupta Kings and their Successors (1889), forming the third volume of the Corpus Inscriptionarum Indicum, was a well-regarded example of his scholarship. Meanwhile, his civil service career progressed. He was appointed the Senior Collector in 1889, Commissioner of the Southern Divisions in 1891, and also Central Divisions in 1892. He was made the Commissioner of Customs in 1893.

In 1895, the best of his works, The Dynasties of the Kanarese Districts of The Bombay Presidency from the earliest historical times to the Musalman Conquest, was published in the Gazetteer of the Bombay Presidency. It was a synthesis of all the data that he had collected over the years through epigraphic and historical sources in his areas of interest. The work deals with a number of dynasties, from the Kadambas, Gangas of Orissa and Karnataka, and Latas, to the Chalukyas, Rashtrakutas, and Seunas. The work formed a basis for further studies of the periods covered by these dynasties.

=== Retirement and death ===
Fleet retired from the ICS in 1897 and returned to England to settle in Ealing. He was now able to devote his full time to his epigraphical studies and continued with his valuable contributions to the Royal Asiatic Society of Great Britain and Ireland and Epigraphia Indica. In 1906, he became the Honorary Secretary of the Society and was awarded its "gold medal" in 1912.

Before his death in 1917 at age 69, he published the Ballads of the Peasantry with its music in the Indian Antiquary.

== Fellowships ==
- Hon' Secretary, Royal Asiatic Society of Great Britain and Ireland.
- Member, Bombay Branch of The Royal Asiatic Society.
- Member of the Asiatic Society of Bengal.
- Corresponding Member of The Royal Society of Science, Göttingen.
- Fellow of The University of Bombay.

== See also ==
- Tosham rock inscription
- Sondani inscription
