= Budhagupta =

Gupta emperor from 476 to 495

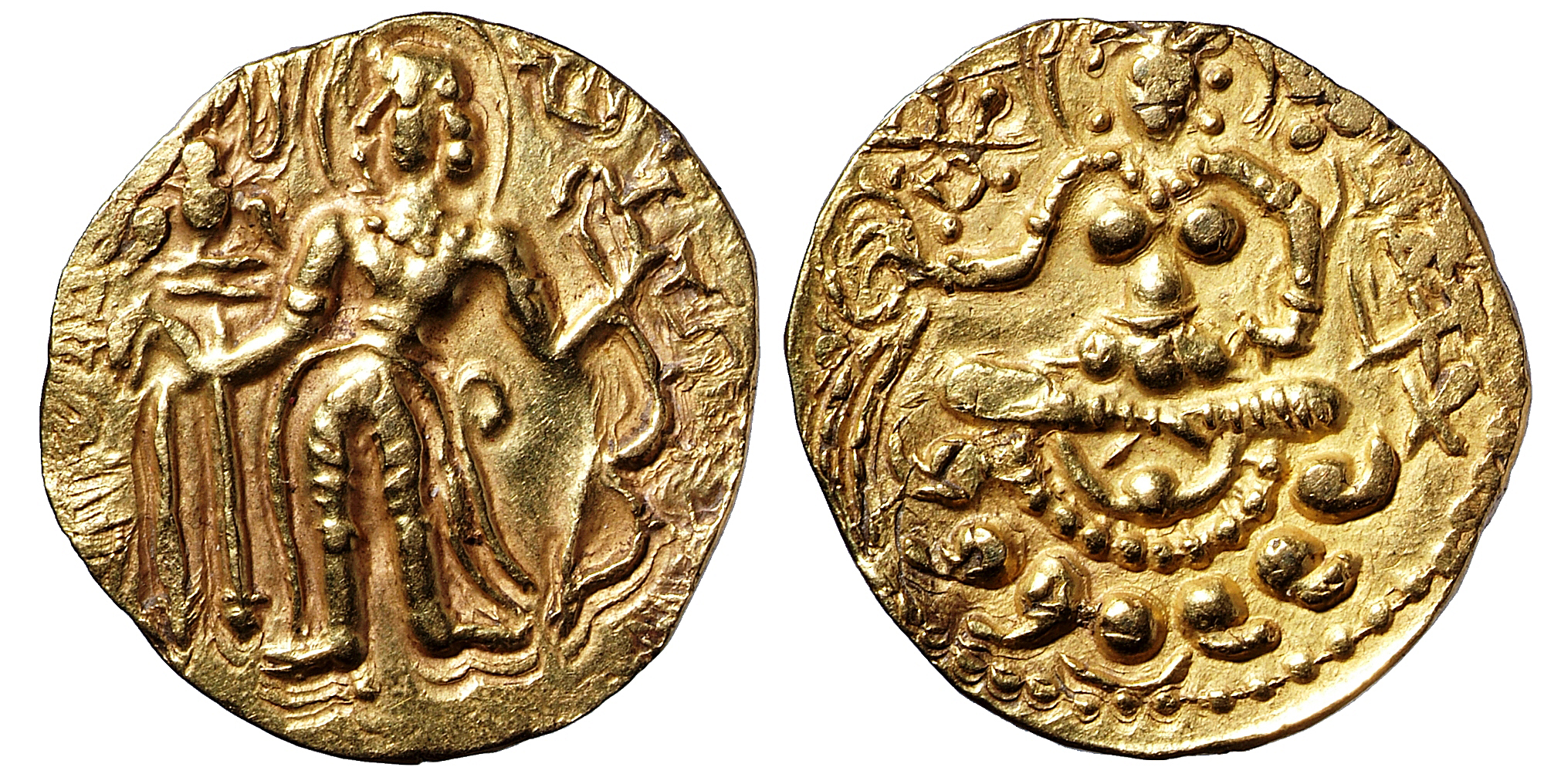
- Gold coin of Budhagupta

Gupta emperor
- Reign: c. 476 – c. 495 CE
- Predecessor: Kumaragupta II
- Successor: Narasimhagupta
- Dynasty: Gupta

Location of the inscriptions mentioning Budhagupta as ruler.

Budhagupta (Gupta script: Bu-dha-gu-pta, r. c. 476 – 495 CE) was a Gupta emperor and the successor of Kumaragupta II. He was the son of Purugupta and was succeeded by Narasimhagupta.

== Rule ==
Budhagupta had close ties with the rulers of Kannauj and together they sought to run the Alchon Huns (Hunas) out of the fertile plains of Northern India.

Northern India, and in particular the area of Eran, was next invaded by the Alchon Huns ruler Toramana, who set up his own inscription there, the Eran boar inscription of Toramana, circa 510-513 CE.

== Inscriptions ==
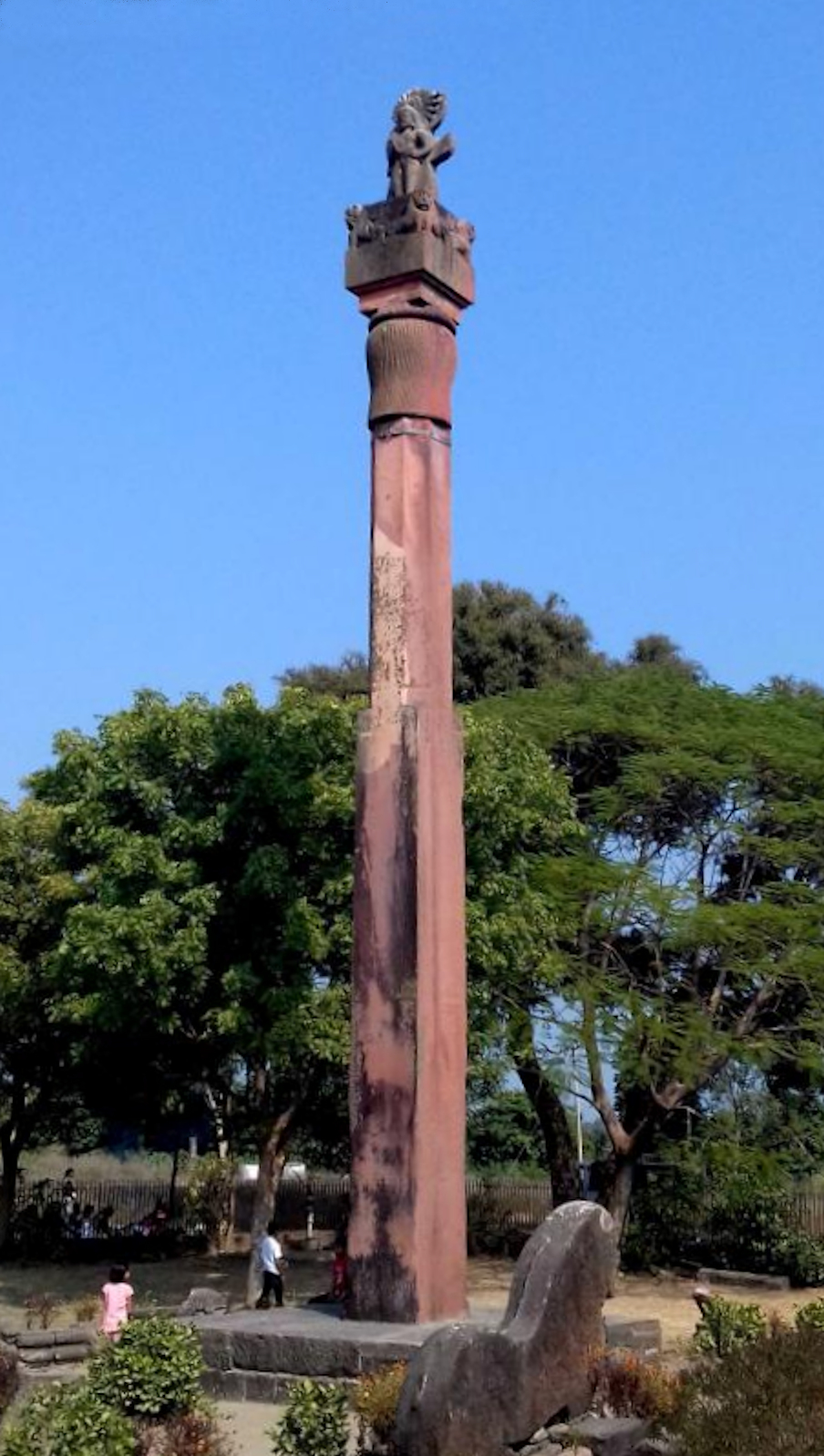
The Budhagupta pillar at Eran, raised in honour of Janardana, another name of Vishnu. On top if a double statue of Garuda, holding a serpent in his hands, with a chakra wheel in the back.

The Damodarpur copper-plate inscription informs us that Pundravardhana bhukti (the present-day North Bengal) was ruled by his two viceroys (Uparika Mahararaja) Brahmadatta and Jayadatta.

The Eran stone pillar inscription of two brothers, Mātṛviṣṇu and Dhanyaviṣṇu mentions Budhagupta as their emperor (Bhupati), under whom Maharaja Surashmichandra was governing the land between the Yamuna and the Narmada The Budhagupta inscription on the Eran column is on the west face towards the bottom of the lower and square part of a large monolithic red-sandstone column situated near the ruined group of temples at Eran. The inscription refers to the reign of Budhagupta over the area "between the rivers Kâlindi and Narmadâ", and it is dated 484–485 CE. The object of it is to record the erection of the column, which is called 'dhvajastambha' or flag staff of the god Vishnu. This pillar is about 48 feet high. This inscription was discovered by T.S. Burt in 1838.

A pedestal of a Buddha statue found at Govindnagar near Mathura bears an inscription "in the reign of Budhagupta in year 161" (circa 480 CE). This is the only known epigraphic evidence showing that Budhagupta's authority extended to Mathura in the north.:

...Today, when king Budhagupta of the famous dynasty is administering the whole earth, in the year one hundred and sixty one...

— Budhagupta inscription of Govindnagar, Mathura.

Two standing Buddha images from Sarnath are known, with bear dated inscriptions mentioning the "Gift of Abhayamitra in 157 in reign of Buddhagupta" (157 of the Gupta era being 477 CE). There are also stone inscriptions in Varanasi and Eran and a seal from Nalanda mentioning Budhagupta as the ruler, as well as several copperplate inscriptions.

=== First Buddha statue with inscription of Budhagupta ===
When a century of years increased by fifty-seven of the Guptas had passed away and on the seventh day of the dark fortnight of Vaiśākha, when the lunar mansion was Múla, when Budhagupta was ruling (the earth), this charming image of one having divine sons (disciples) (Buddha), that is adorned with wonderful art was caused to be made by me Abhayamitra, a Buddhist monk. Whatever religious merit I have acquired in causing this image to be made, let it be for the attainment of final beatitude of my parents, preceptors and mankind.

— Inscription of Budhagupta (Gupta Era 157)
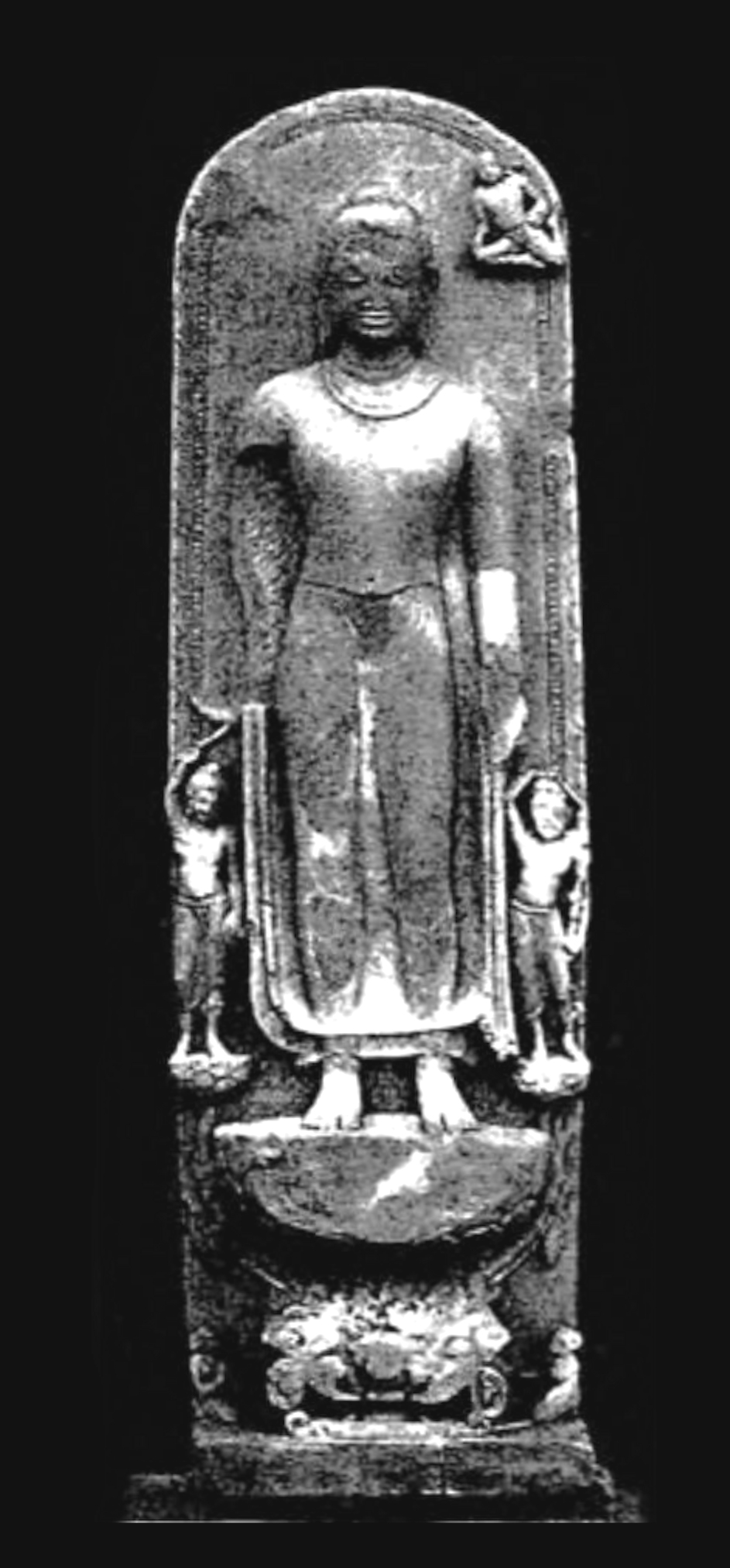
Buddha statue inscribed "Gift of Abhayamitra in 157 in the reign of Buddhagupta" (476 CE) Sarnath Museum.

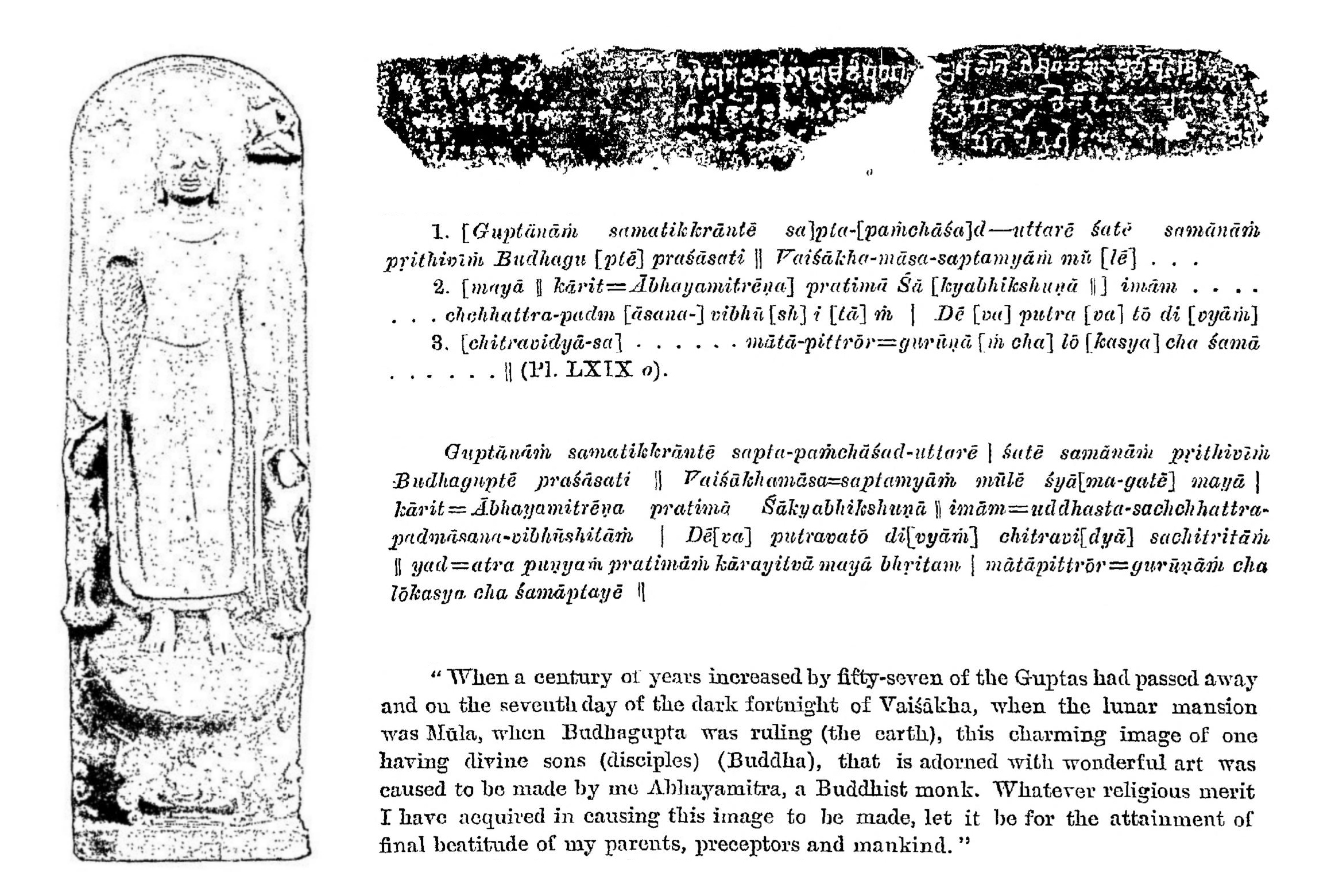
Buddha inscription of Budhagupta in the Gupta Era year 157, with extrapolation and English translation.

=== Second Buddha statue with inscription of Budhagupta ===
A second statue of the standing Buddha found in Sarnath has a dated inscription (year 157) in the name of Budhagupta. This statue is defaced, but the devotees at the feet of the Buddha are beautifully preserved. The content is partially preserved, but essentially identical to an inscription on the first statue, made by the same donor, allowing for reconstruction.

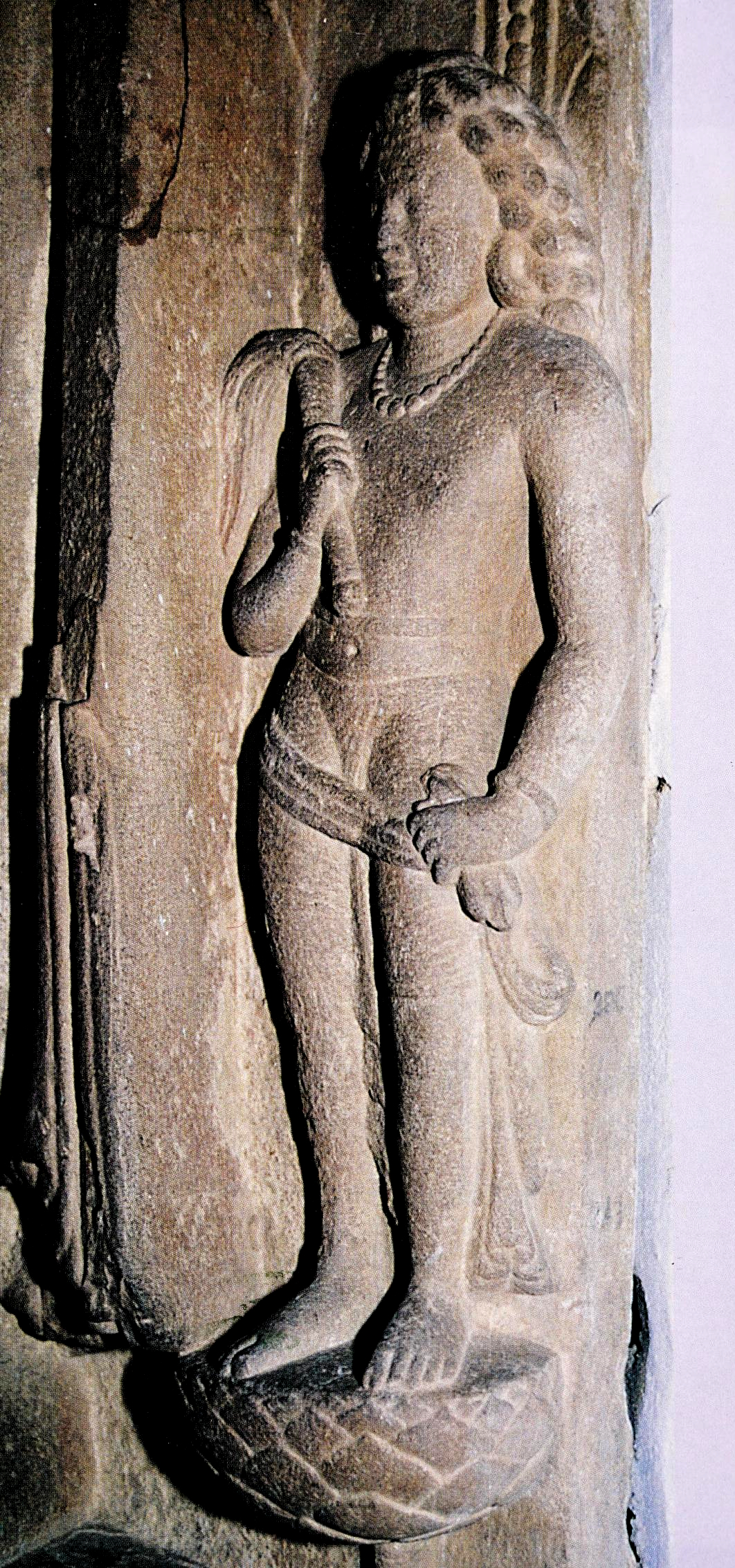
Buddhist devotee on the second statue of the standing Buddha (fragment), inscribed "Gift of Abhayamitra in 157 in the reign of Buddhagupta" (477 CE). Sarnath Museum.

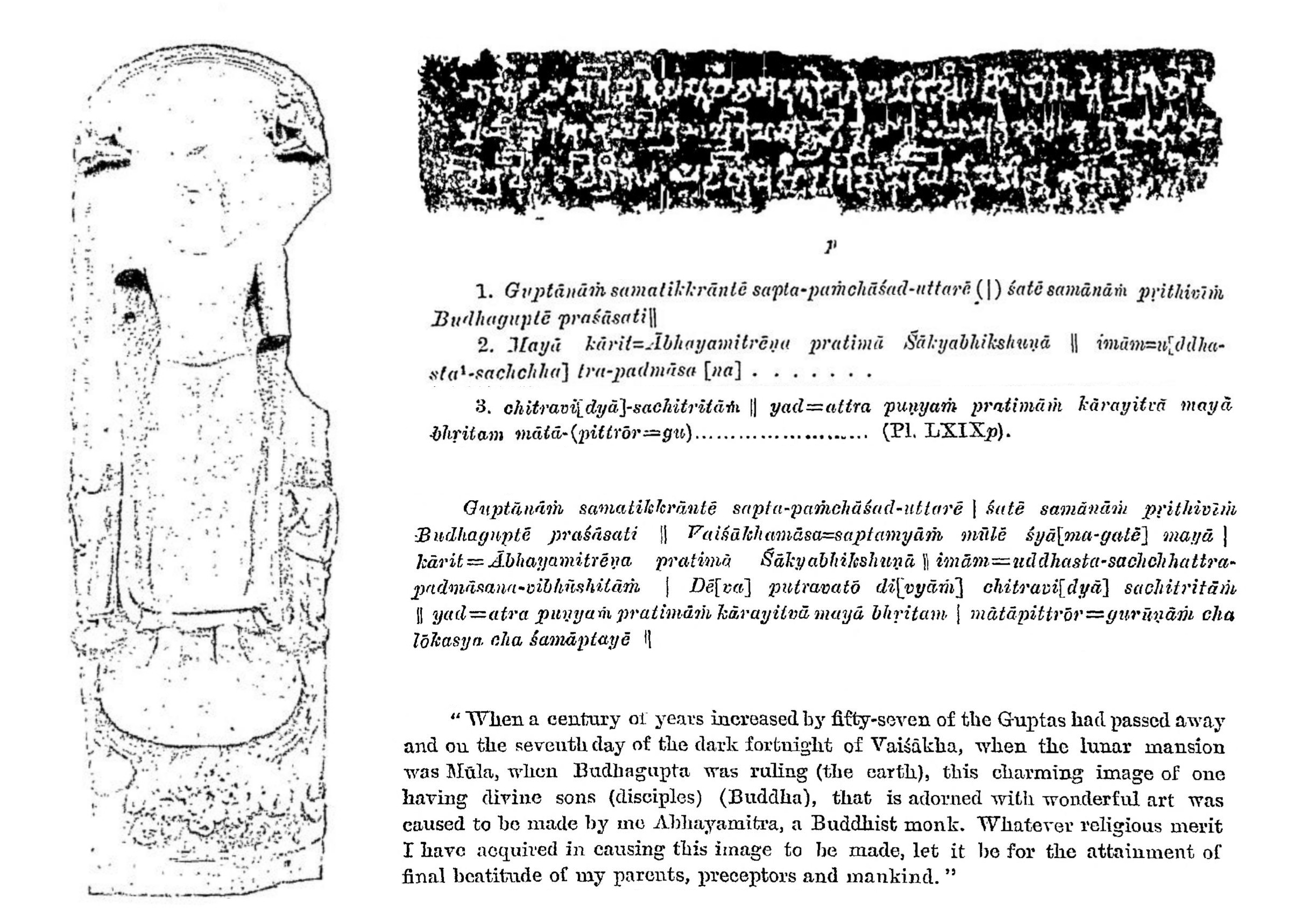
Buddha inscription of Budhagupta in the Gupta Era year 157 (second statue), with extrapolationa and English translation.

=== Other inscriptions of Budhagupta ===
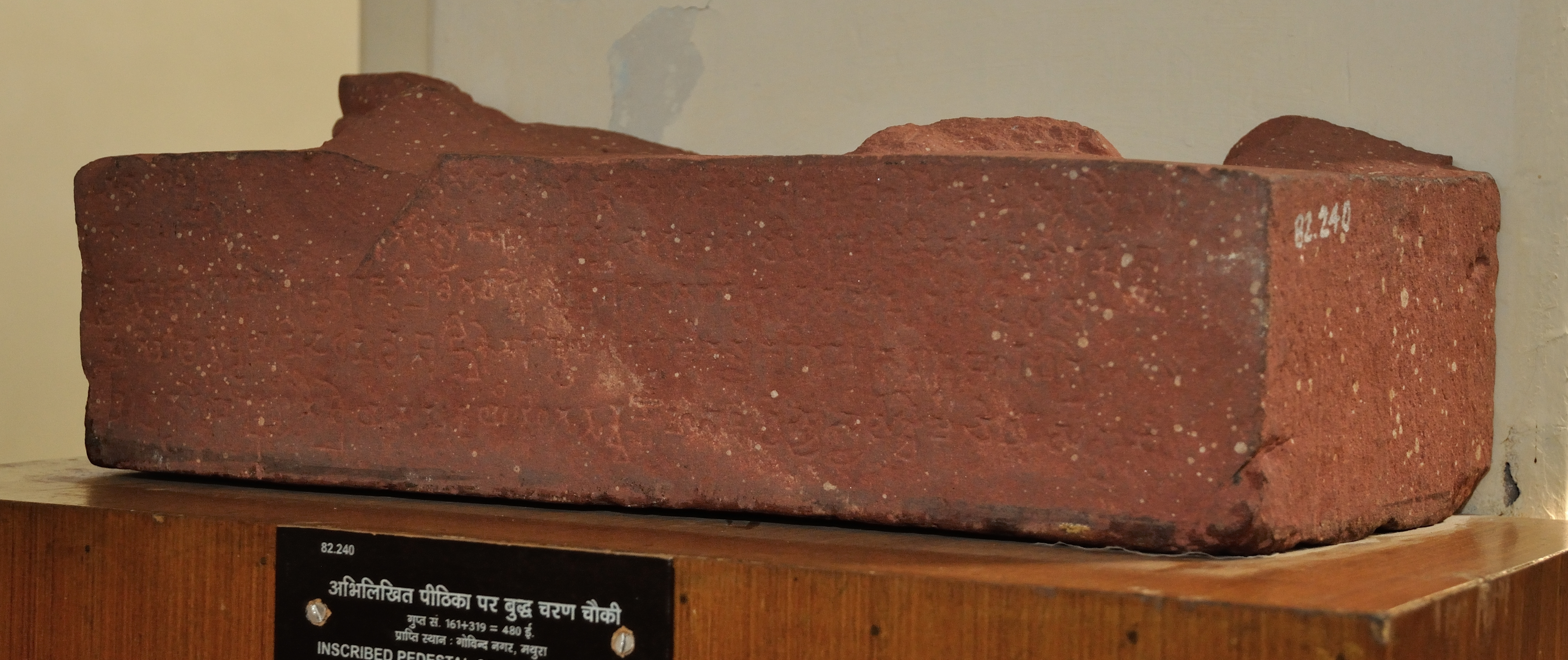
Inscribed pedestal of Buddha installed "in the reign of Budhagupta in year 161" (circa 480 CE). Govind Nagar. Mathura.

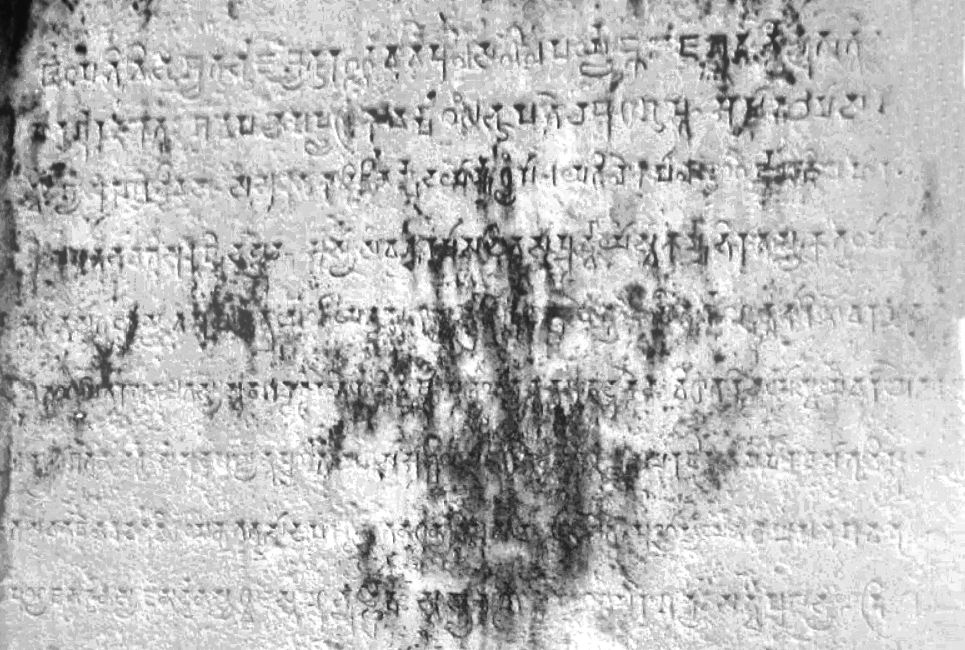
Budhagupta pillar inscription at Eran.

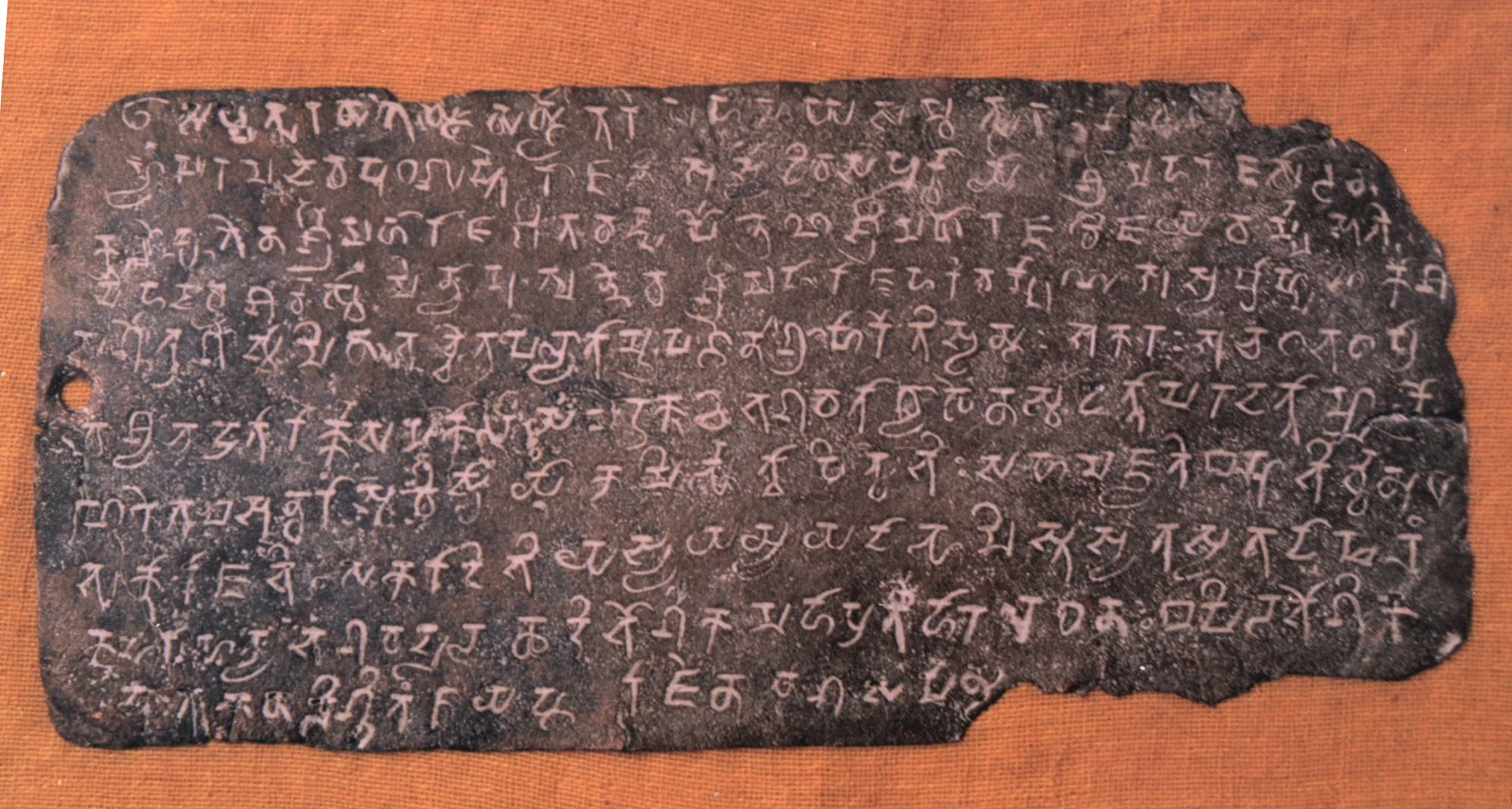
Copper-plate charter of Budhagupta, dated Gupta year 168

Regnal titles
Preceded by Kumaragupta II	Gupta Emperor; 476–495	Succeeded by Narasimhagupta
