= First Battle of Eran =

5th century confrontation in India

- Part of First Hunnic War of the Gupta–Hunnic Wars
- Find spots of epigraphic inscriptions (red dots) indicating local control by the Alchon Huns in India between 500 and 530 CE, with neighbouring polities, and territorial extent of the Alchon Huns (brown).
Date	498 CE
Location	Eran (Modern day India) 24.0890°N 78.1650°E
Result	Hunnic victory
Territorial changes	Malwa fell to the Hunas

Belligerents
Gupta Empire	Alchon Huns

Commanders and leaders
Budhagupta; Suraśmicandra; Mātṛviṣṇu †; Dhanyaviṣṇu (surrendered)	Toramana; Harigupta; Bhuta
- Location of the battle within India

The First Battle of Eran was a key engagement of the First Hunnic War that took place in 498 CE at Airikana (Eran), India. It was fought between the Gupta Empire and the invading army of Alchon Huns. The battle involved the Emperor Budhagupta, his viceroys, and Toramana, an acclaimed Hunnic king. The confrontation had significant consequences for the political and territorial situation in the region. The conflict concluded with a victory for the Alchon Huns that influenced subsequent events in the region.

== Prelude ==
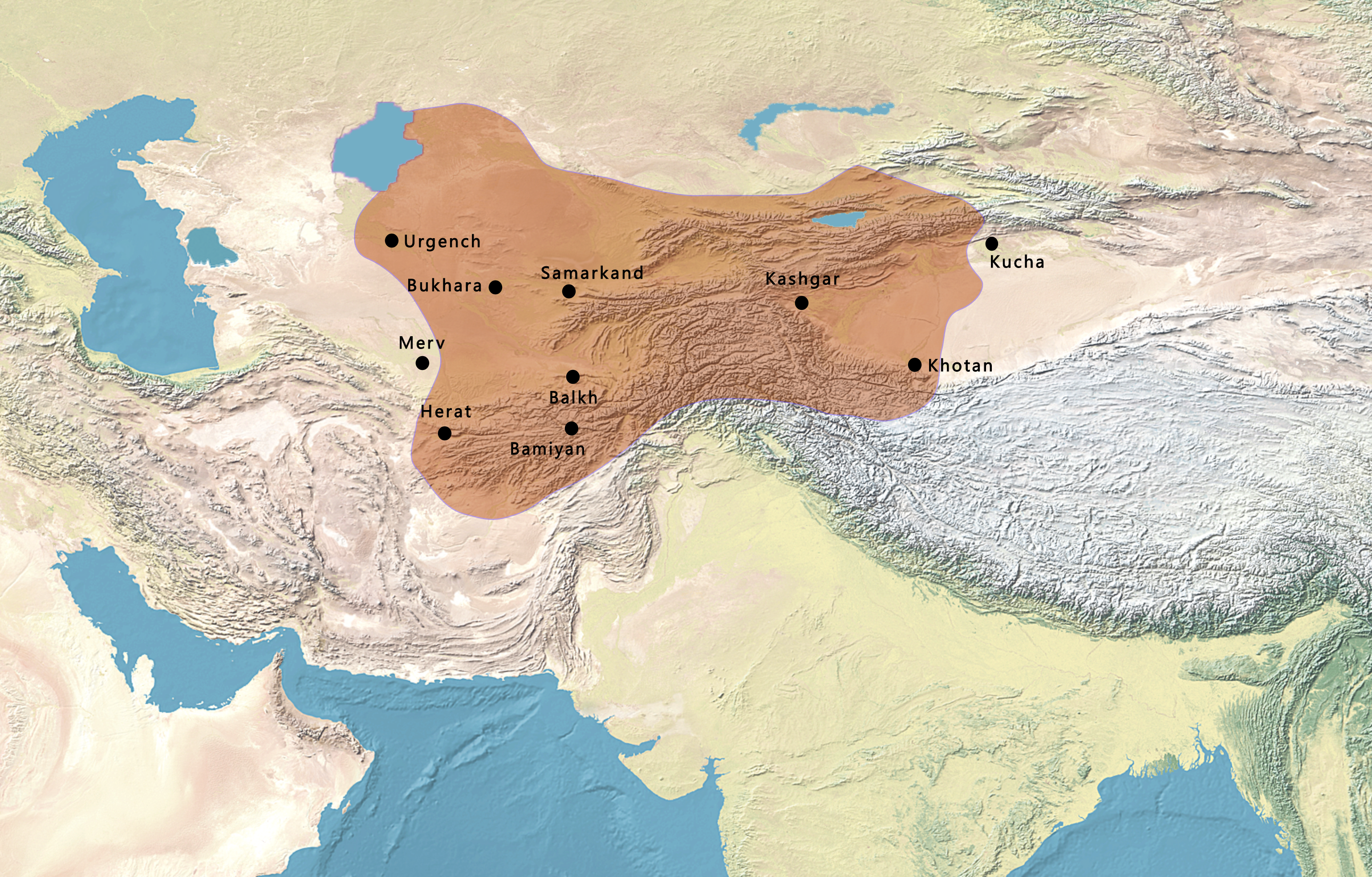
Territory of the Hepthalite Empire, circa 500

The invasion of the Hepthalites followed a geographical trajectory similar to that of the Indo-Greeks during the post-Maurya period and was later mirrored by the Turks. Like the Indo-Greeks and the Turks, the Hunas initially consolidated their power in the Punjab region. After their defeat by Skandagupta, they shifted their focus back to Persia. In 456 CE, Yazdegerd II continued his struggle against them. Following his death in 457 CE, the Sassanian Empire came under the rule of Peroz I, who was defeated by the Hephthalite king Akun (or Akhshunwar) and forced to pay tribute.

In 484 CE, Peroz I launched an offensive against the Hephthalites but was defeated and killed. According to Chavannes, based on Chinese historical accounts, by around 500 CE, the Huna Empire included Tokharistan, Kabulistan, and Zabulistan, with Gandhara and Chitral being the only regions of "India proper" under their control. The Chinese traveler Song Yun, who visited Gandhara in 520 CE, provided further details on the state of the region during that time:

This is the country which the Ye-thas destroyed, and afterwards set up a Tch'e-le (a tegin, prince or the member of the royal family) to be the king over the country; since which event two generations have passed.

— Song Yun, The Chinese traveler

Song Yun's account suggests that the power of Jaūvla extended to Gandhara approximately two generations before his visit in 520 CE. The identity of the Huna king who led the conquest of Gandhara remains uncertain. However, it is plausible that King Ramanila, known only from his coins, preceded Toramana and played a key role in the Huna conquest of the region. Nevertheless, it cannot be ruled out that Ramanila belonged to a different dynasty than that of Toramana.[[File:Toramana portrait and initials Tora.jpg|190px|center|thumb|

Portrait of Toramana and Gupta script initials Tora, from his bronze coinage.]]

Toramana, a prominent ruler of the Alchon dynasty, successfully established political and cultural dominance in the Punjab, which fostered his imperial ambitions. During this time, the Sasanian Empire was in turmoil following a coup against Kawad I in 496 CE. Although Kawad I regained power in 498 CE, his authority remained heavily reliant on the Hephthalites, the Hunnic rulers north of the Hindu Kush.

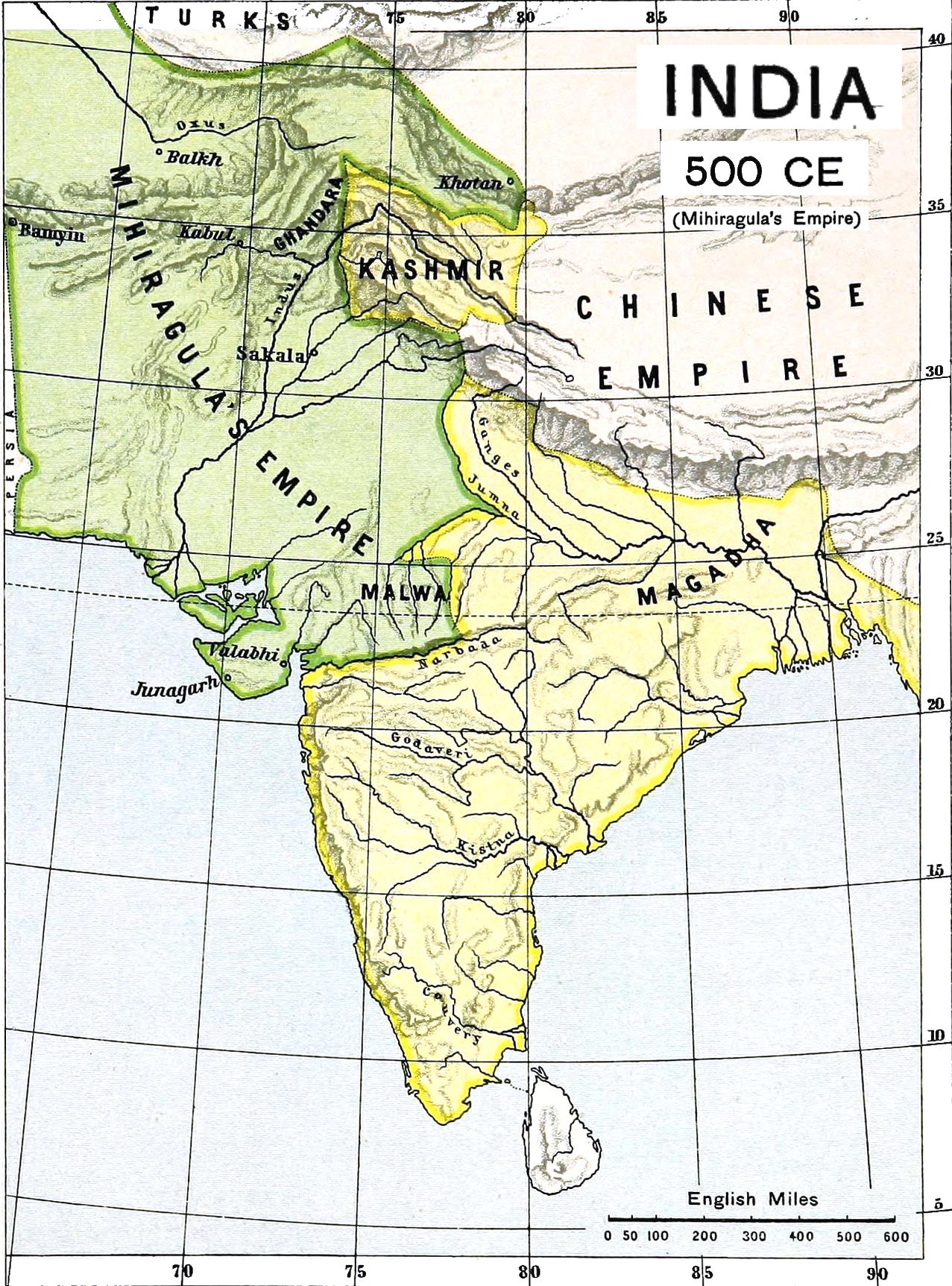
Charles Joppen's construction in 1907 of possible Indian map in 500 AD

Capitalizing on this opportunity, Toramana launched an invasion of northern and western India from the Punjab, possibly from a stronghold on the banks of the Candrabhaga River. Within a year, he assumed the title of Maharajadhiraja, or Emperor, as evidenced by the inscription on the Boar of Eran, which describes him as 'the glorious Toramana, of great fame and great lustre.'

== Background ==
=== Toramana's prospect ===
[[File:Toramana gold coin circa 490-515.jpg|thumb|255px|

A rare gold coin of Toramana with Lakshmi on the reverse (c. 490–515), inspired from contemporary Gupta coins, such as those of Narasimhagupta Baladitya. The obverse legend reads "avanipati torama(no) vijitya vasudham divam jayati": "The lord of the earth, Toramana, having conquered the earth, wins Heaven".]]

The Alkhans gradually expanded their influence in the northwest of the Indian subcontinent during the latter half of the 5th century. This culminated with Toramana's rise to power as the leader of the Alkhan quadrumvirate, declaring himself "King of Kings" (Rajadhiraja) as evidenced by the. Khura Stone Inscription. By the close of the century, the Alkhan had significantly integrated into Indian society and culture. According to Bakker, this integration may have fueled Toramana's ambitions for territorial expansion, guided not by the supposed ferocity often attributed to the Huns, of which there is scant evidence, but by principles from the Indian Book of State, which emphasized the ideal ruler's duty to pursue conquest.

=== Toramana's campaign ===
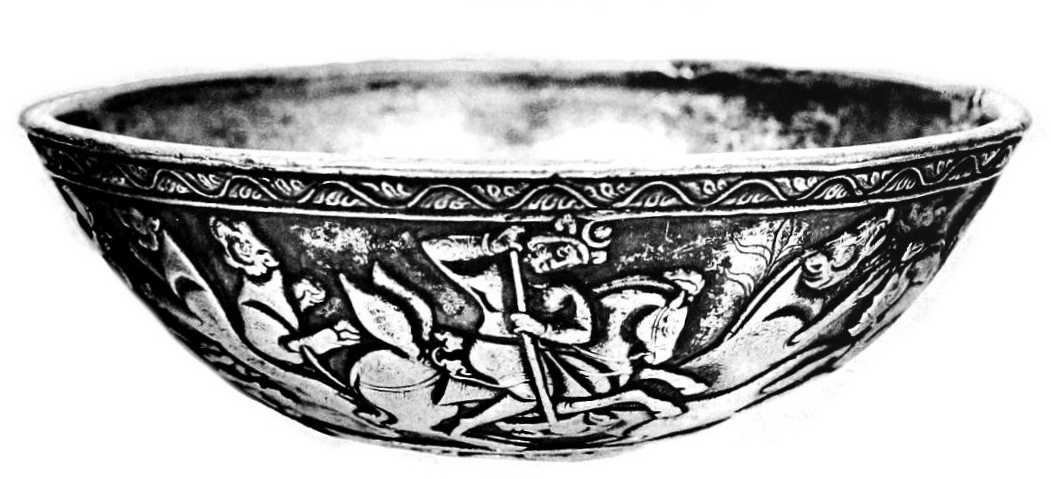
The silver bowl in the British Museum

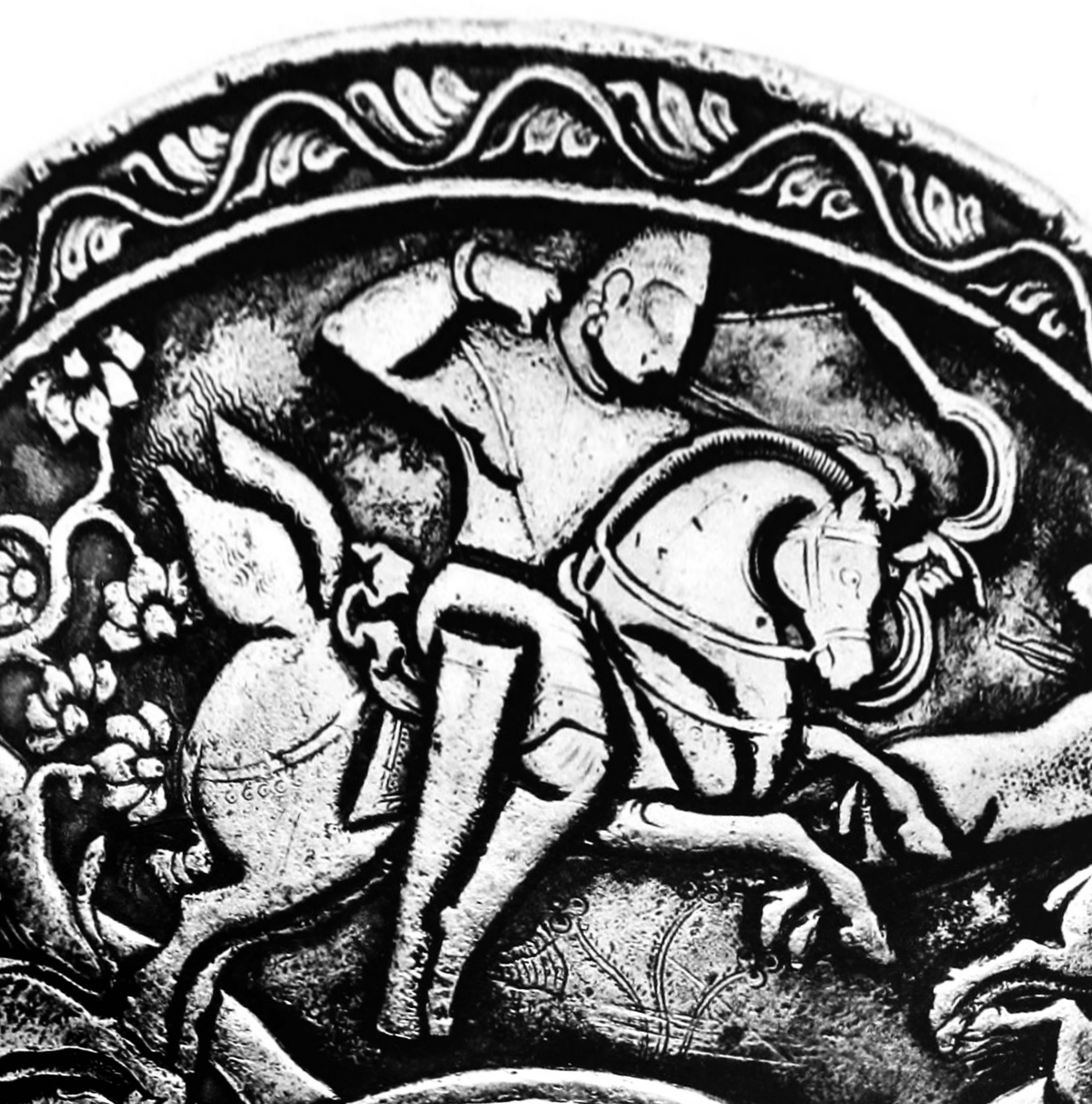
Alchon horseman.

The so-called "Hephthalite bowl" from Gandhara, features two Kidarite hunters wearing characteristic crowns, and as well as two Alchon hunters (one of them shown here, with skull deformation), suggesting a period of peaceful coexistence between the two entities. Swat District, Pakistan, 460–479 CE. British Museum.

Toramana emerged as a formidable and charismatic leader with exceptional military skills. His dominance over rival Hunnic factions, forcing them into subordinate roles, and his strategic establishment of Parvatikā on the Chenab (Candrabhaga) River in Punjab as his operational base underscore his tactical acumen. His rapid military campaigns resulted in the conquest of large areas of northern and western India within a few years, culminating in the construction of the Goparaja funereal monument in AD 510.

== Battle ==
[[File:Eran archaeological site map, 1880 sketch.jpg|left|thumb|upright=1.3|

Eran archaeological site map, 1880 sketch]]

This conflict, which Bakker refers to as the First Hunnic War, began with a campaign led by Toramana around AD 498. The Alkhan king invaded the Ganga–Yamuna Doab, capturing Mathura, crossing the Yamuna near Kalpi (Kalapriyanatha), and advancing south into the Betwa valley to attack the western territories of the Gupta Empire. The Eran Pillar inscription of Budhagupta from Gupta Year 165 (AD 484) mentions Suraśmicandra, the Gupta viceroy of these territories, who claimed to govern the region between the Ganga and Narmada rivers. Suraśmicandra confronted Toramana alongside Budhagupta in the battle.

[[File:Eran Budhagupta inscription.jpg|250px|thumb|

Budhagupta pillar inscription at Eran.]]

The Budhagupta inscription is dated to 484–485 CE. It is a Vaishnava inscription. It describes that the Gupta kingdom stretched from Kalindi River to Narmada River, that the inscription marks the raising of a column in honour of Janardana, another name of Vishnu.

A. [Tibetan: H. = Hūṇa], having come from the West, was a great king. He occupied the banks of the Ganges up to the East. He was of Śūdra caste, a mahārāja of large army and great power. From his base on the Ganges, from all sides he invaded the city of the Gauḍas called Tīrtha and remained there as a powerful king. There that Kṣatriya boy with a merchant entered at night, and was acknowledged at the dawn by the Śūdra king, who then retired to Nandapura [=Pāṭaliputra] on the Ganges, and in Magadha installed that boy as king.

— Installation of Pra[kaṭāditya] by H[ūṇa], Mañjuśrīmūlakalpa

[[File:Eran Budhagupta pillar built circa 476–495 CE.jpg|thumb|upright=1|left|

The Buddhagupta pillar at Eran (c.476–495 CE), raised in honour of Janardana, another name of Vishnu. On top is a double statue of Garuda, holding a serpent in his hands, with a chakra wheel behind the head.]]

The two powers eventually clashed in the fertile plains around Eran, also known as Airikana, or the "Refreshing Fields," where the Betwa and Bina rivers meander. On the southern banks of the Bina, Budhagupta had overseen of a religious complex dedicated to Vishnu, the Gupta Empire’s tutelary deity. In this area, two local feudatories, Maharaja Mātṛviṣṇu and his younger brother Dhanyaviṣṇu, had constructed a twin temple, which was guarded by a 13-meter-high pillar, the 'Column of Janardana' (Vishnu/Krishna).

The two inscriptions discovered at Eran provide valuable insight into the period. The first inscription, dated to 484 CE, records a pious construction by Maharaja Mātṛviṣṇu and his younger brother Dhanyaviṣṇu during the reign of Budhagupta. The second inscription, however, documents Dhanyaviṣṇu's construction of a temple after his brother’s death, in the first year of Rajadhiraja Maharaja Toramana Sahi Jauvla's rule. This suggests that Dhanyaviṣṇu, a prominent official, abandoned the Gupta emperor during this critical time to offer his allegiance to the Hunas. This shift in loyalty likely occurred sometime after 484 CE, but within a generation.

The Kuvayamālā, a jain work composed in 778 CE, mentions Harigupta, linked to the Gupta dynasty, as the mentor of Toramana. It also notes another of his students, Devagupta, who is referred to as a royal sage (Rajarshi). Furthermore, copper coins found in the Ramnagar area, which was part of the ancient Panchala region, suggest the presence of a ruler named Maharaja Harigupta, who is believed to have been active around 500 CE. Harigupta, likely a scion of the Gupta imperial family, is believed to have established himself in northern Panchala. The reasons for his potential alliance with the Huna invaders are not fully explained by the available historical sources.

== Legacy ==
[[File:Kura inscription of Toramana.jpg|thumb|center|upright=1.5|

The Kura inscription of Toramana. Starting "In the prosperous reign of the King of Kings, the Great King Toramana Shahi Jauhkha...". "Toramana" ( Gupta script: Toramāṇa, appears in the 1st line of the inscription.]]

The first battle of Eran, fought under the banner of the Imperial Eagle, marked a substantial defeat. During the early phase of his campaign, Toramana adopted the title Maharajadhiraja, as recorded in the Eran Stone Boar Inscription superseding his earlier title Rajadhiraja, mentioned in the Khura Stone Inscription. This elevated title had traditionally been associated with the Gupta emperors, symbolizing Toramana’s assertion of imperial authority.

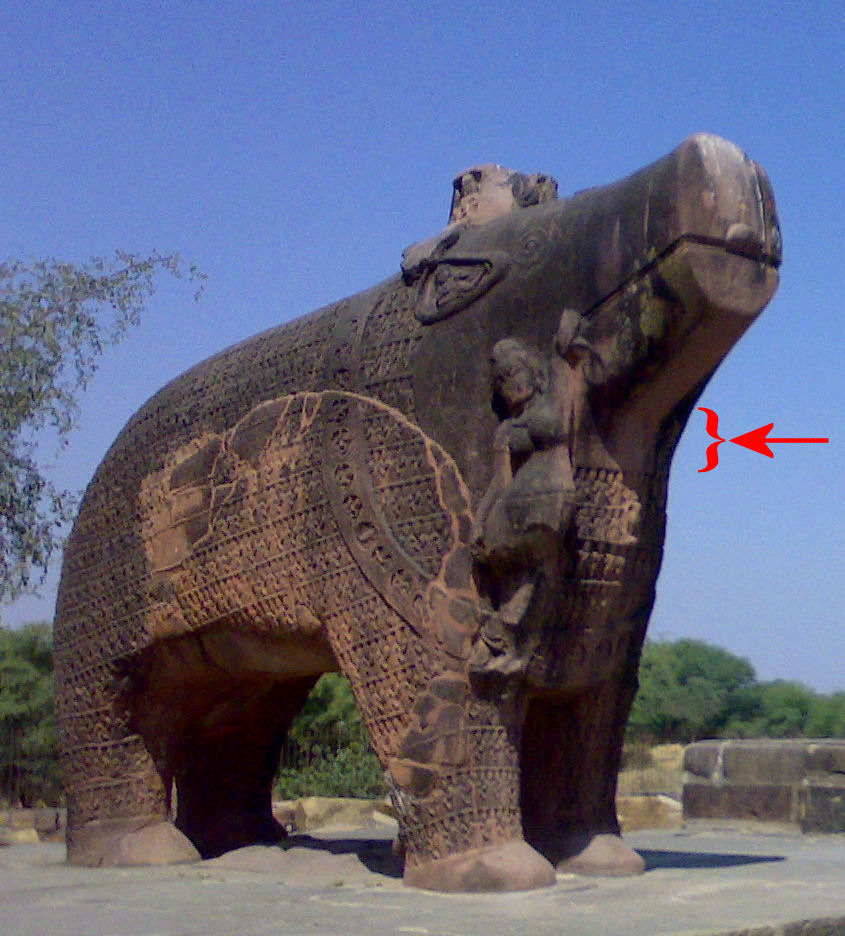
The Eran boar, under the neck of which the Toramana inscription can be found (area indicated in red).

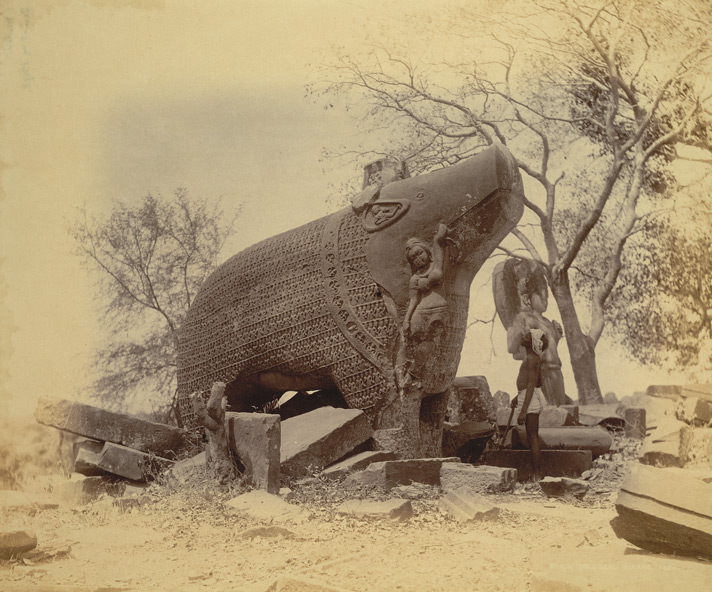
The Eran Varaha boar statue with ruins in late 19th-century, showing the relief on the boar's body.

After these events, the local ruler Dhanyaviṣṇu was compelled to decide between submitting to Toramana’s rule or facing death. He chose submission. Although the power of the former empire had waned, a sense of resilience persisted. This resilience was reflected in the completion of a 3.5-meter-high Varaha statue, a representation of the boar incarnation of Vishnu, which Dhanyaviṣṇu was allowed to finish.

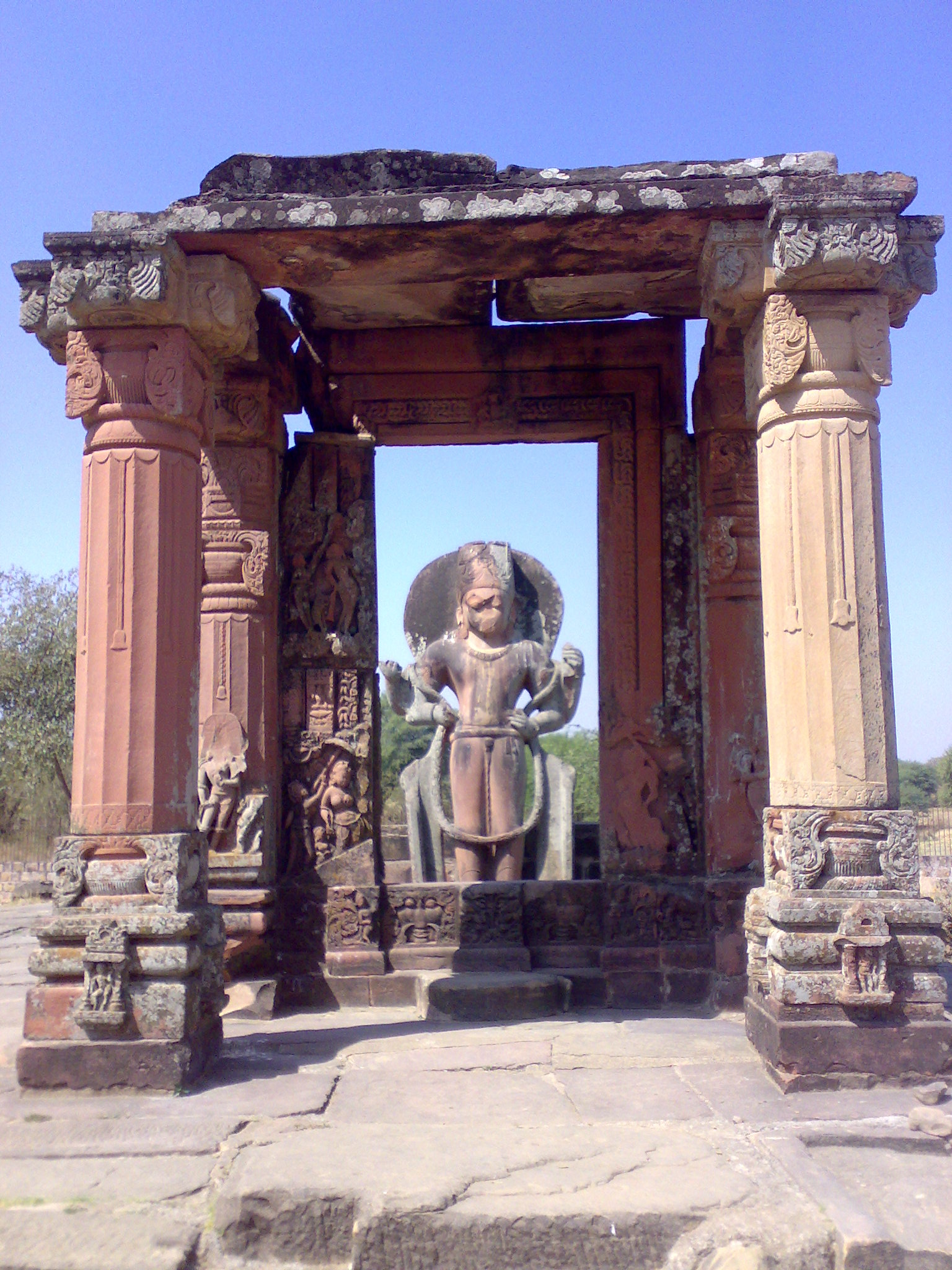
Mandapa of the Vishnu Temple at Eran

The monument reflects Dhanyaviṣṇu's devotion to Vishnu, who, according to the Mahabharata, rescued the earth during times of cosmic distress by lifting it on his tusks. Toramana, noted for his favorable stance toward Vaishnavism, may have viewed the statue’s symbolism as aligning with the moment’s significance circumstances.

== Aftermath ==
=== Toramana's endeavors ===
Kausambi

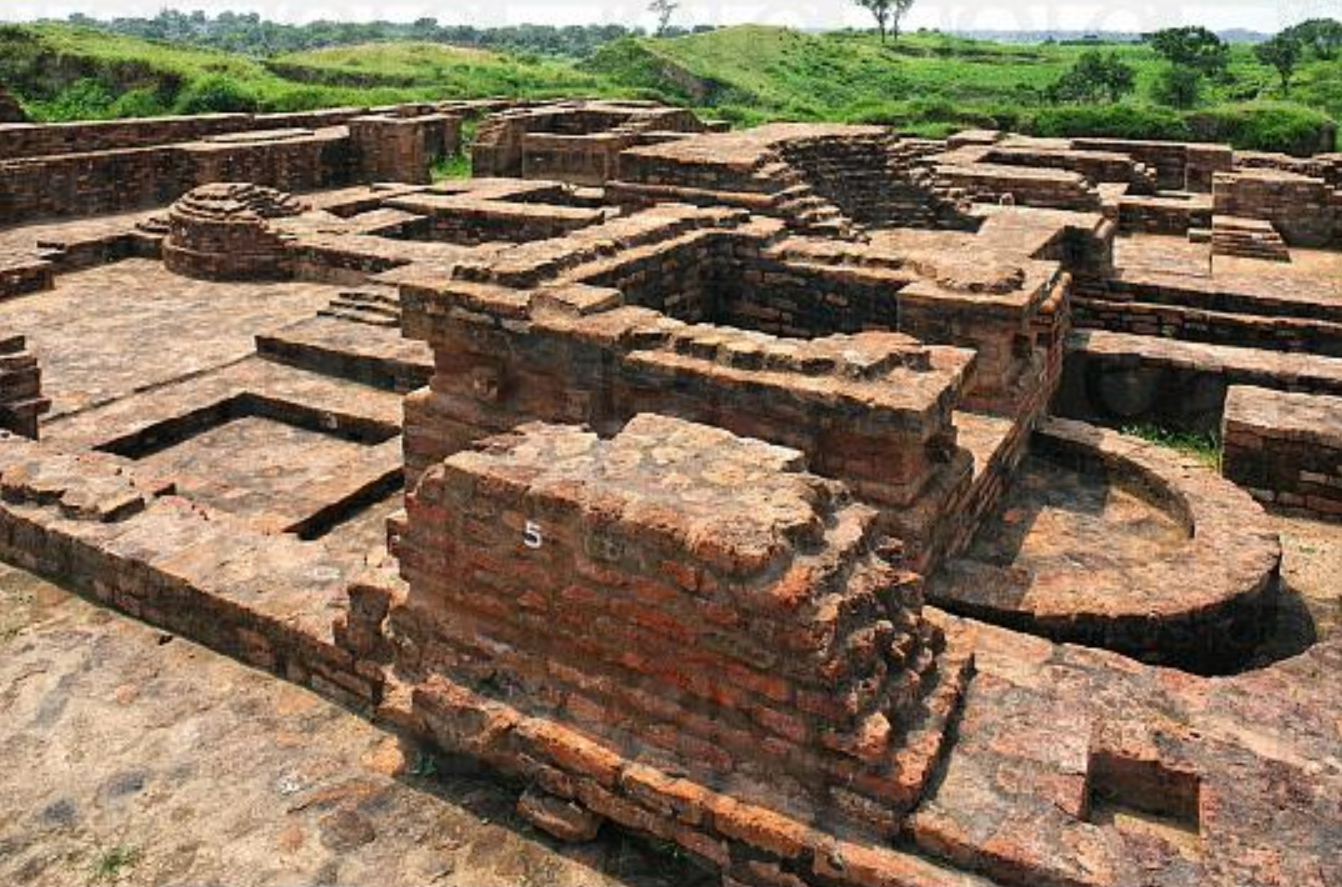
The monastery of Ghoshitarama in Kausambi was probably destroyed by the Alchon Huns under Toramana.

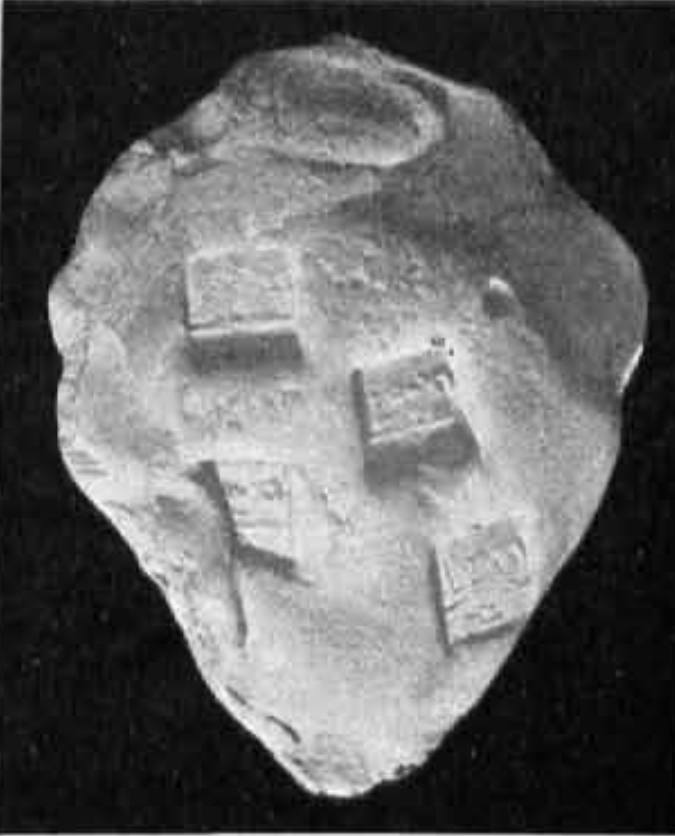
"Hūna Rāja" Toramana seal impression, Kausambi

Toramana's actions suggest that his goal was not merely to dismantle the Gupta Empire but to bring it under his dominion. After consolidating control over the western territories, the Alchon king advanced toward the empire's core. Archaeological evidence provides crucial insights into this campaign. Excavations at the ancient city of Kaushambi reveal widespread destruction in its final phase of occupation, indicating a significant attack. Among the findings was a seal impression from the Ghositarama monastery bearing the letters "To Ra Ma Na," likely linking the devastation to Toramana. The evidence also suggests that Kaushambi never fully recovered from this event.

=== Access to Arabian sea ===
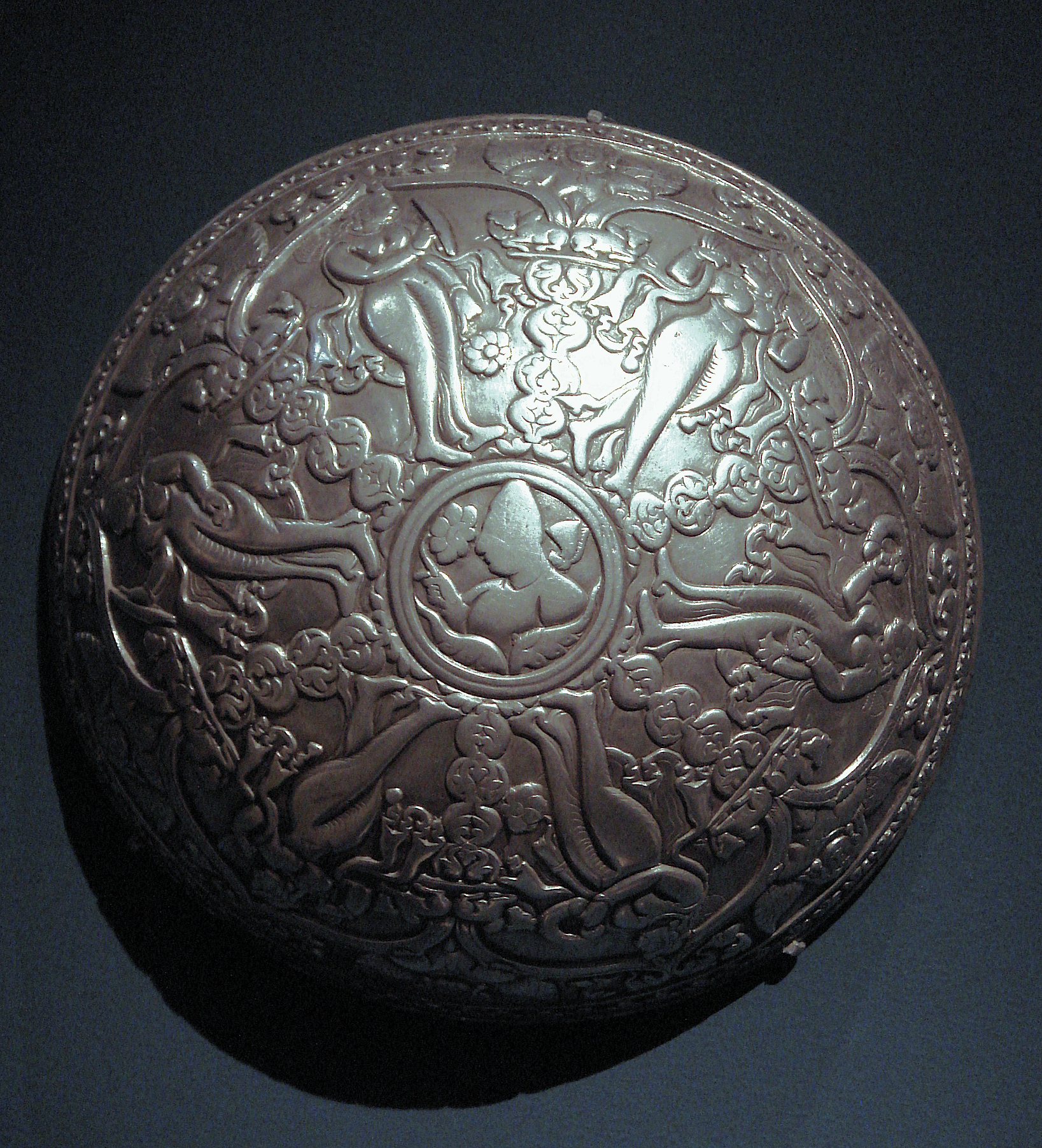
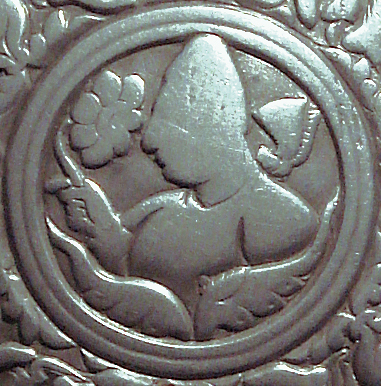
The Chilek bowl, with an Alchon Hun ruler in the central medallion, surrounded by naked Indian-style dancers.

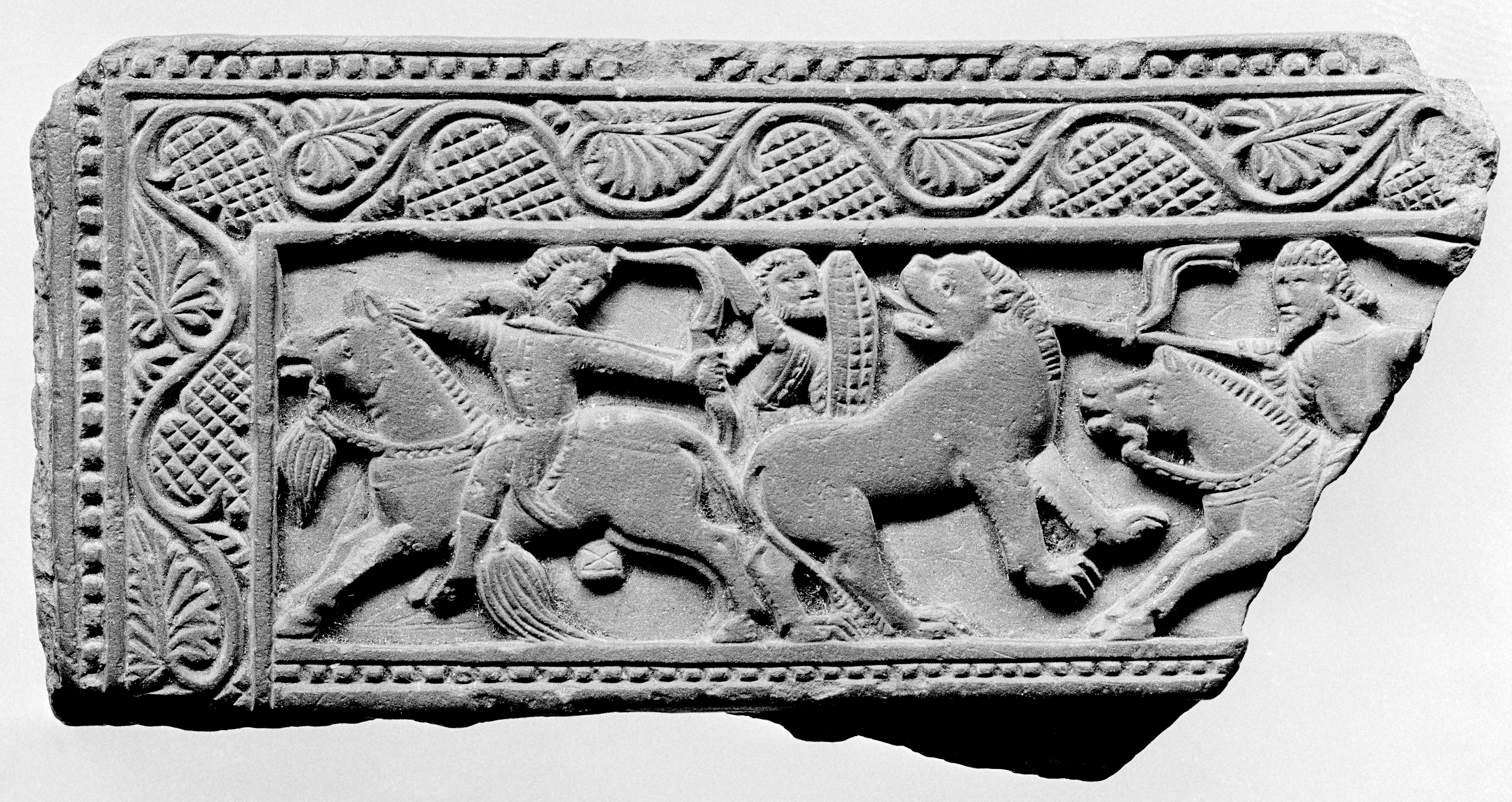
Fragment of a lid with a hunting scene, Gandhara, 5-6th century CE.

Toramana's numismatic and epigraphic records demonstrate his appreciation for Indian culture, which is also reflected in his military campaigns in Rajasthan and Gujarat. Seeking to control the western trade route from Mathura to the Arabian Sea, Toramana launched an expedition in his second or third year, passing through Madhyamika (Nagari) and Dasapura (Mandasor) toward Bharukaccha (modern Bharuch) on the Gulf of Cambay. Along this route was Vadrapali, a significant trade center mentioned in three copper plates, likely corresponding to the modern town of Sanjeli in North Gujarat, where the plates were discovered.

=== Sanjeli copper plate ===
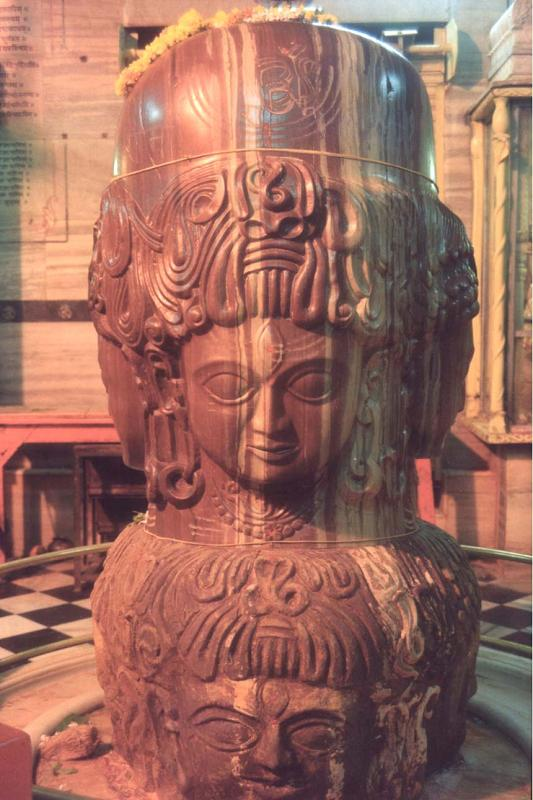
Idol of Lord Pashupatinath in Mandsaur

Sanjeli's unique geographical features, surrounded by low, rocky mountains that formed natural fortifications, made it an ideal strategic site for caravans traveling to the coast. Demonstrating his organizational abilities, Toramana appointed Bhuta as governor of the Sivabhagapura district, located about 1,000 kilometers south of his Panjab homeland. The first Sanjeli copper plate records that—

"In the third year of the reign of the supreme lord Maharajadhiraja, the illustrious Toramana, thanks to whose grace Śivabhagapura is ruled by Maharaja Bhuta as district governor."

— First Sanjeli copper plate

=== Major routes ===
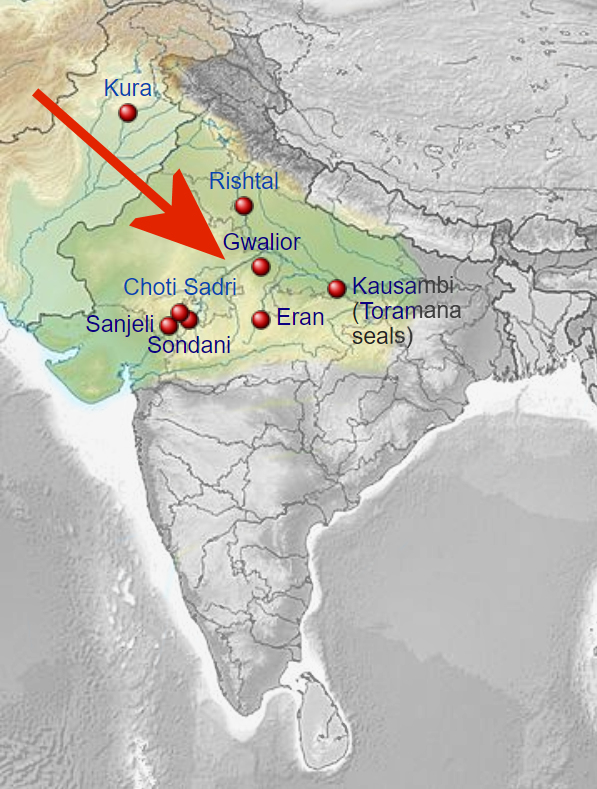
Routes taken by Alchon Huns

Toramana's route through Rajasthan and Gujarat appears to have followed the ancient caravan track from Mathura to the Gulf of Cambay, bypassing the eastern Betwa valley route taken in his earlier invasion.This is supported by the location where the Sanjeli copper plates were found, which may have been a town in the Sivabhagapura district, and the list of merchants involved in the tax agreement, hailing from places connected by these trade routes. Within three years of the Battle of Eran, Toramana had secured control over major trade routes in western India, effectively linking the Central Asian trade network, controlled by his Hephthalite allies, with India’s commercial infrastructure and its key seaports on the Arabian Sea. His power was derived not from plunder, as often suggested, but from his control over this expansive transnational trade network.

== See also ==
- Second battle of Eran
- Skandagupta
- Battle of Sondani
- Kidara I
- Hepthalites

== Bibliography ==
- Goyal, S. R. (1967). Ahistory of the Imperial Guptas.With a Foreword by R. C. Majumdar.
- Balogh, Dániel (12 March 2020). Hunnic Peoples in Central and South Asia: Sources for their Origin and History. Barkhuis. ISBN 978-94-93194-01-4.
- Bajpai, K. D. (2004). Indian Numismatic Studies. Abhinav Publications. ISBN 978-81-7017-035-8.
- Burgess, Jas (1892). Epigraphia Indica Vol.1.
- Fleet, John F. (1960) [1888]. Inscriptions Of The Early Gupta Kings And Their Successors. Inscriptionum Indicarum. Vol. III (3rd Revised ed.). Varanasi, India: Indological Book House.
- Bakker, Hans (29 June 2015). The World of the Skandapurāṇa. BRILL. ISBN 978-90-04-27714-4.
- Schwartzberg, Joseph E. (1978). A Historical atlas of South Asia. Chicago: University of Chicago Press. ISBN 0226742210. Archived from the original on 7 February 2025.
