= Second Battle of Eran =

510 confrontation in India

- Part of First Hunnic War of the Gupta–Hunnic Wars
- Find spots of epigraphic inscriptions (red dots) indicating local control by the Alchon Huns in India between 500-530 CE, with neighbouring polities, and territorial extent of the Alchon Huns (brown).
Date	29 June 510
Location	Eran (Modern day India) 24.0890°N 78.1650°E
Result	Gupta victory
Territorial changes	Toramana retreated to Gwalior after being expelled from central India.

Belligerents
Gupta Empire: Aulikara dynasty	Alchon Huns

Commanders and leaders
Bhanugupta; Prakāśadharman; Goparaja †	Toramana (WIA)
- Location within South Asia Battle of Eran (Madhya Pradesh)

The Second Battle of Eran, (Note: In Gupta Year 191 (ad 510) Goparāja and Rāja Bhānugupta fight together in the second battle of Eran (against Toramāna?), in which Goparāja is killed (SB X.035).) which took place around 510 CE, was a pivotal battle between the Gupta Empire's Emperor Bhanugupta and the Huna army of Toramana. The battle, which finds mention in the Eran inscription, was fought at the cost of the death of Bhanugupta's general, Goparaja. It was a key battle in halting the Huna invasion of eastern Malwa or attempting to expel them from the region. The battle was the first of a series of reverses for the Huna conqueror. In his battle against the invaders, Bhanugupta might have had the support of King Prakāśadharman, the king of Mandasor.

== Background ==
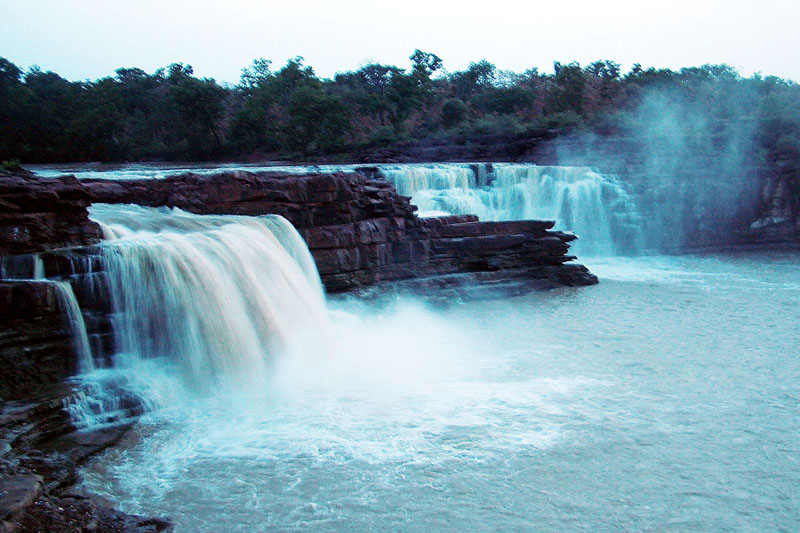
Rahatgarh Waterfall on Beena River

The fertile plains around Eran, also referred to as Airikana or the "Refreshing Fields," at the junction of the Betwa and Bina rivers, became a battleground between the great powers. This historically significant locality had a religious complex dedicated to Vishnu, the patron deity of the Gupta Empire, built during the time of Emperor Budhagupta. Two local feudatories, Maharaja Mātṛviṣṇu and his younger brother Dhanyaviṣṇu, raised a twin temple, under the shadow of the 13-meter-tall 'Column of Janardana' (Vishnu/Krishna), marking the area's religious and cultural significance.

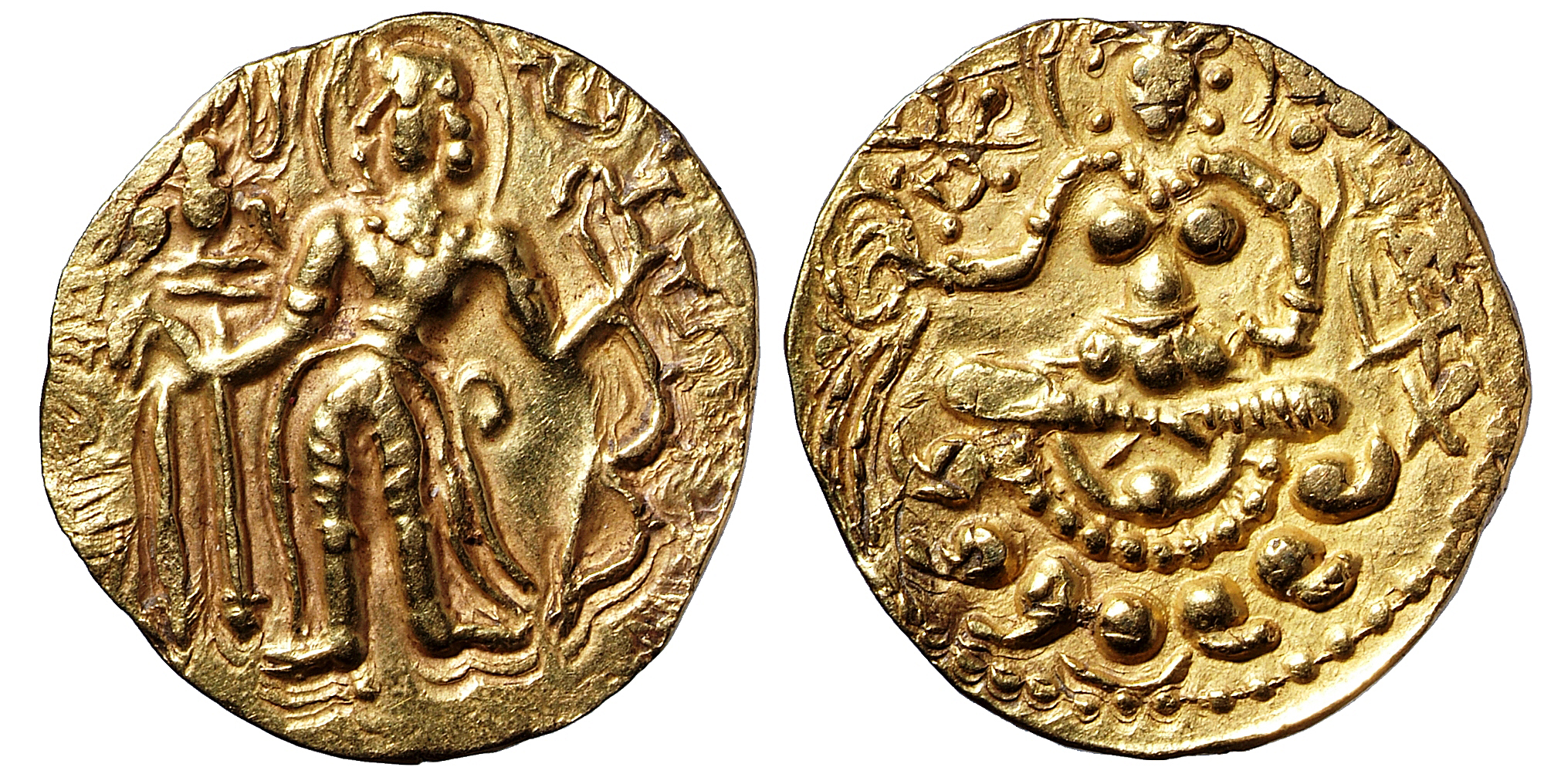
Gold coin of Budhagupta

The First Battle of Eran was a turning point battle between the Gupta Empire and the Hunas, led by Toramana. Eran inscriptional evidence reveals that by the first year of Toramana's reign, Dhanyaviṣṇu, a renowned local official, defected from the Guptas to the Hunas. This defection, carved in a temple inscription, marks the rise in the power of the Hunas and their ability to influence regional political forces.

== Battle ==
Goparaja's posthumous inscription at Eran, dated 510 CE, is of particular significance here. It refers to King Bhanugupta as "the bravest man on the earth" and reports a great battle at Eran, in which his general Goparaja was killed. The battle would have been against the Huna invaders, either to check their advance into eastern Malwa or to expel them from the region entirely. If the aim had been to check their advance, it is safe to put Toramana's conquest of eastern Malwa around 510 CE; otherwise, if the aim had been expulsion, the battle would have occurred earlier. Although the occupation of the region by the Huna cannot be pinpointed as accurately as we would like, it can be inferred that Toramana's penetration into India proper occurred some years after 500 CE, and the Hunas were initially confined to Gandhara. By 510 CE, Toramana's hold over Malwa may be assumed to be firmly in place.

Eran pillar inscription of Goparaja

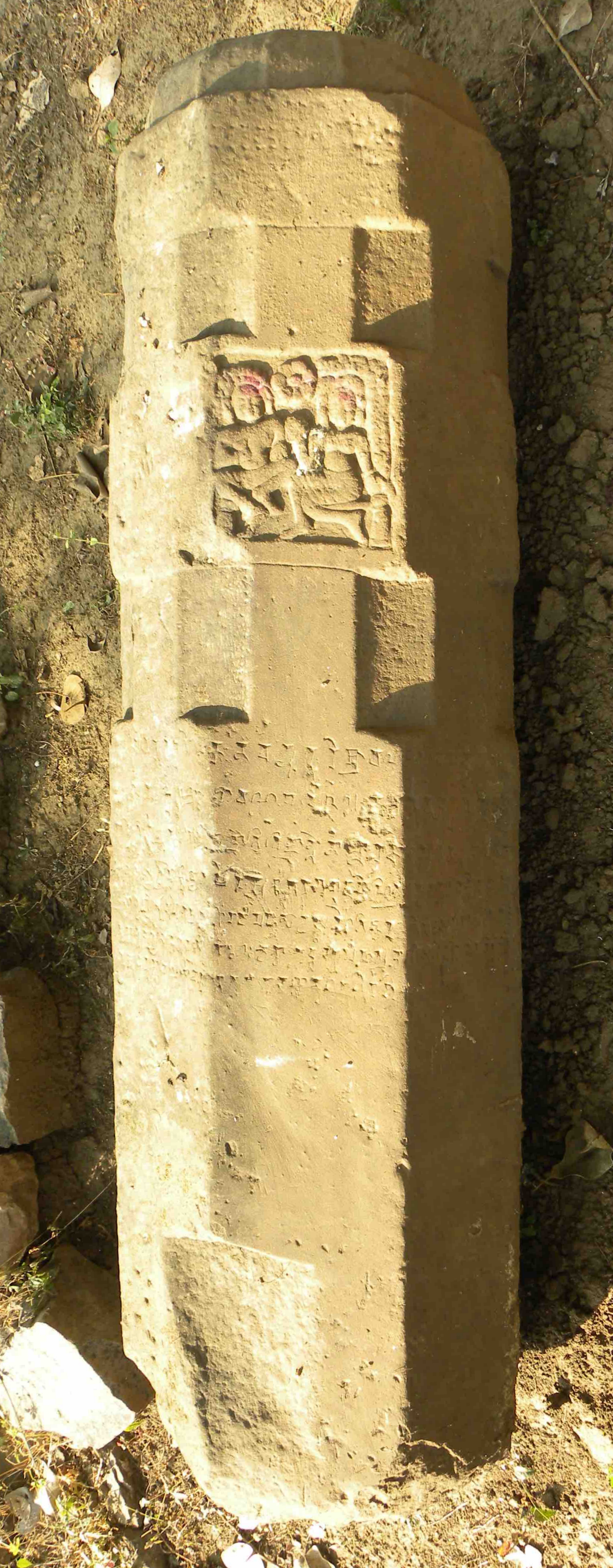
Eran pillar of Goparaja

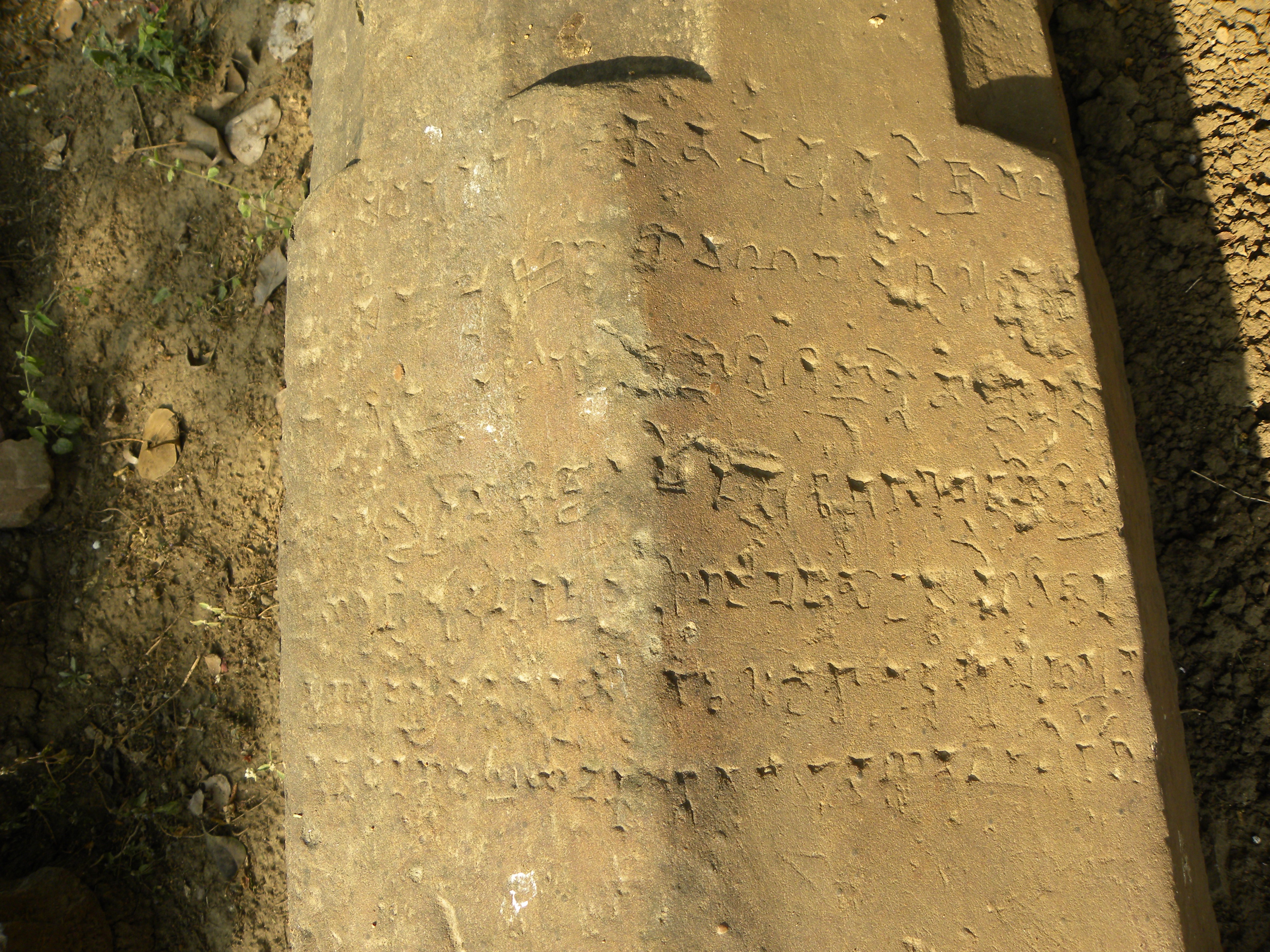
Eran stone pillar inscription of Bhanugupta.

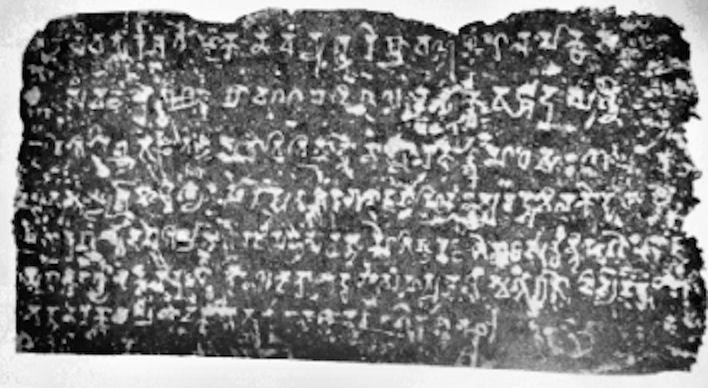
Rubbing of the inscription.

- (Lines 1-2) Ōm ! When a century of years, increased by ninety-one, (had elapsed) on the seventh lunar day of the dark fortnight of (the month) Śrāvaṇa, (or in figures) the year 100 (and) 90 (and) 1 (the month) Śrāvaṇa the dark fortnight; the (lunar) day 7;-
- (Verse 1) (there was) a ruler, renowned as . . . . rāja sprung from the Śulakkha lineage; and his son (was) valorous by the name (of) Mādhava.
- (Verse 2) His son was the illustrious Goparaja, renowned for manliness; the daughter's son of the Sarabha king;1 who became the ornament of (his) family.
- (Verses 3-4) (There is) the glorious Bhanugupta, a distinguished hero on earth, a mighty ruler, brave being equal to Pârtha. And along with him Goparaja, following (him) without fear, having overtaken the Maittras and having fought a very big and famous battle, went to heaven, becoming equal to Indra, the best of the gods; and (his) devoted, attached, beloved, and beauteous wife, clinging (to him), entered into the mass of fire (funeral pyre). (Bhanugupta Eran inscription 510 CE.)

According to Hans T. Bakker, the inscription does not contain an explicit statement regarding the success or failure of the battle. From the events that follow, it may be inferred that the inscription marks the beginning of a chain of woes for the Huna conqueror. In his struggle against the invader, Bhanugupta might have had the backing of the person of King Prakāśadharman, the king of Mandasor.

[[File:Male head, northern India, Kushan or Gupta period, 5th-6th century CE, terracotta, HAA.JPG|thumb|

Male head, northern India, 5th – 6th century CE]]

The connection in question is most likely due to the sister of Bhanugupta (or another close relation), who was wedded to Ravikīrti, the amātya of Rājyavardhana, father of Prakāśadharman. Bhagavaddosa, Ravikīrti's son and Bhānugupta's nephew (or another relation), was prime minister to Prakāśadharman and may have participated in military campaigns under his maternal uncle. It is presumed that this new line of Mandasor kings, referred to as the 'Later Aulikaras', was to challenge their erstwhile Gupta overlords.

== Aftermath ==
=== Indian resistance ===
Resistance to foreign threats and instability grew in the second half of the 6th century, focusing on a group of Aulikaras who asserted independence in the area. The Rīsthal Inscription of Mālava Year 572 (515 CE) documents the successful reestablishment of order in Daśapura by King Prakāśadharman with the help of the powerful Naigama merchant family. Principal members of this family were rājasthānīyas (viceroys) to the later Aulikaras and helped stabilize the region.

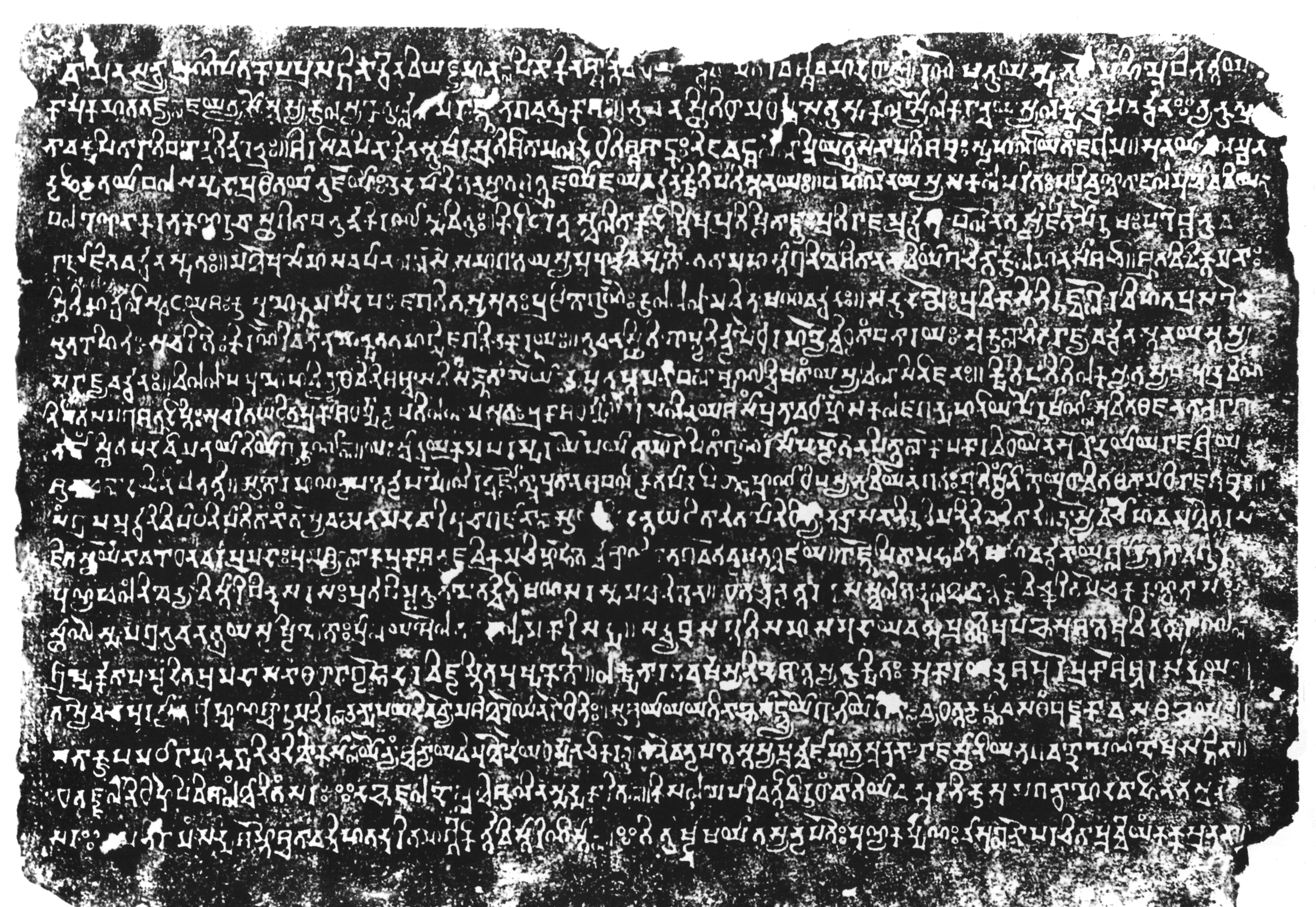
Rīsthal inscription

This period of resilience is not only verified by inscriptions but also by the architectural monuments built by the new rulers of Daśapura. This religious change emphasized the revival, as the sixth-century Aulikara rulers dropped Vaisnavism, the original state religion, in favor of a vigorous and militant form of Shaivism. This form of Shaivism, which was linked with the Pāśupata movement, was from the region between the Narmadā and Mahī and became established in Gujarat and Rajasthan, backed by an interconnected system of temples and Mathas.

=== Rise of Shaivism ===
The following example illustrates the development of Shaivism as a leading cultural force in this era. Though already an established popular faith, Shaivism was revitalized by the Pāśupata school, which was embraced by the political aristocracy to consolidate their ideological system of domination. Vaishnavism, the former state religion, on the other hand, lost its place in this culture. Shaivism introduced new characteristics, such as the appearance of Śiva in the form of the Brahmin named Lakulīśa, which provided ordinary people access to superhuman powers (siddhi) and divine weapons through instructions learned from human gurus (achāryas) who were said to be the very personification of the Lord himself in ritual practice.

[[File:Shiva with Trisula Panjikent 7th–8th century CE Hermitage Museum.jpg|thumb|upright=1.1|

Shiva with Trisula, worshipped in Central Asia. Penjikent, Uzbekistan, 7th–8th century CE. Hermitage Museum.]]

This change benefited the Aulikara rulers, as attested by their great architectural achievements. First among these are the colossal Śiva Śūlapāṇi stele in Daśapura, perhaps commissioned by Bhagavaddosa under the patronage of King Prakāśadharman in the Prakāśeśvara Temple, which, according to the Rīsthal Inscription, was "the ornament of Bhāratavarṣa (India)." About 3 meters in height, this stele rivaled its Vaiṣṇava counterpart, the Varāha statue of Eran, erected by Dhanyaviṣṇu during the conquest of Toramāṇa and similarly renowned as "the pillar of the universe."

=== Aulikara-Hunnic conflicts ===
Prakāśadharman, By whom the title 'Overlord' (adhirāja) of the Hūna commander (adhipa) was nullified in battle, (though it) had been firmly established on earth by the time of King Toramāna, whose footstool had glittered with the sparkling jewels in the crowns of kings (that had bowed at his feet).

— Rīsthal inscription

The actions that occurred in 515 CE, as borne witness to by the Rīsthal Inscription, are regarded as a significant turn of events in Indian history. The inscription boasts of Prakāśadharman on account of canceling the title of "Overlord" (adhirāja) bestowed upon the Hūṇa general, a title that had been well established during the reign of Toramāṇa, a king whose authority had previously made other kings prostrate before him.

== See also ==
- First battle of Eran
- Mātṛviṣṇu
- Mihirakula
- Battle of Sondani
- Bhanugupta
- Aulikara−Hunnic War

== Bibliography ==
- Agrawal, Ashvini (1989). Rise and Fall of the Imperial Guptas. Delhi: Motilal Banarsidass. ISBN 978-81-208-0592-7.
- Bakker, Hans (2015). The World of the Skandapurāṇa. BRILL. ISBN 978-90-04-27714-4.
- Bakker, Hans T. (2020). The Alkhan: A Hunnic People in South Asia. Barkhuis. ISBN 978-94-93194-00-7.
- Goyal, S. R. (1967). A History of the Imperial Guptas. Allahabad: Central Book Depot. OCLC 500357561.
- Schwartzberg, Joseph E. (1978). A Historical atlas of South Asia. Chicago: University of Chicago Press. ISBN 978-0-22-674221-2. Archived from the original on 7 February 2025.
