= Mātṛviṣṇu =

- Maharaja; Vishayapati
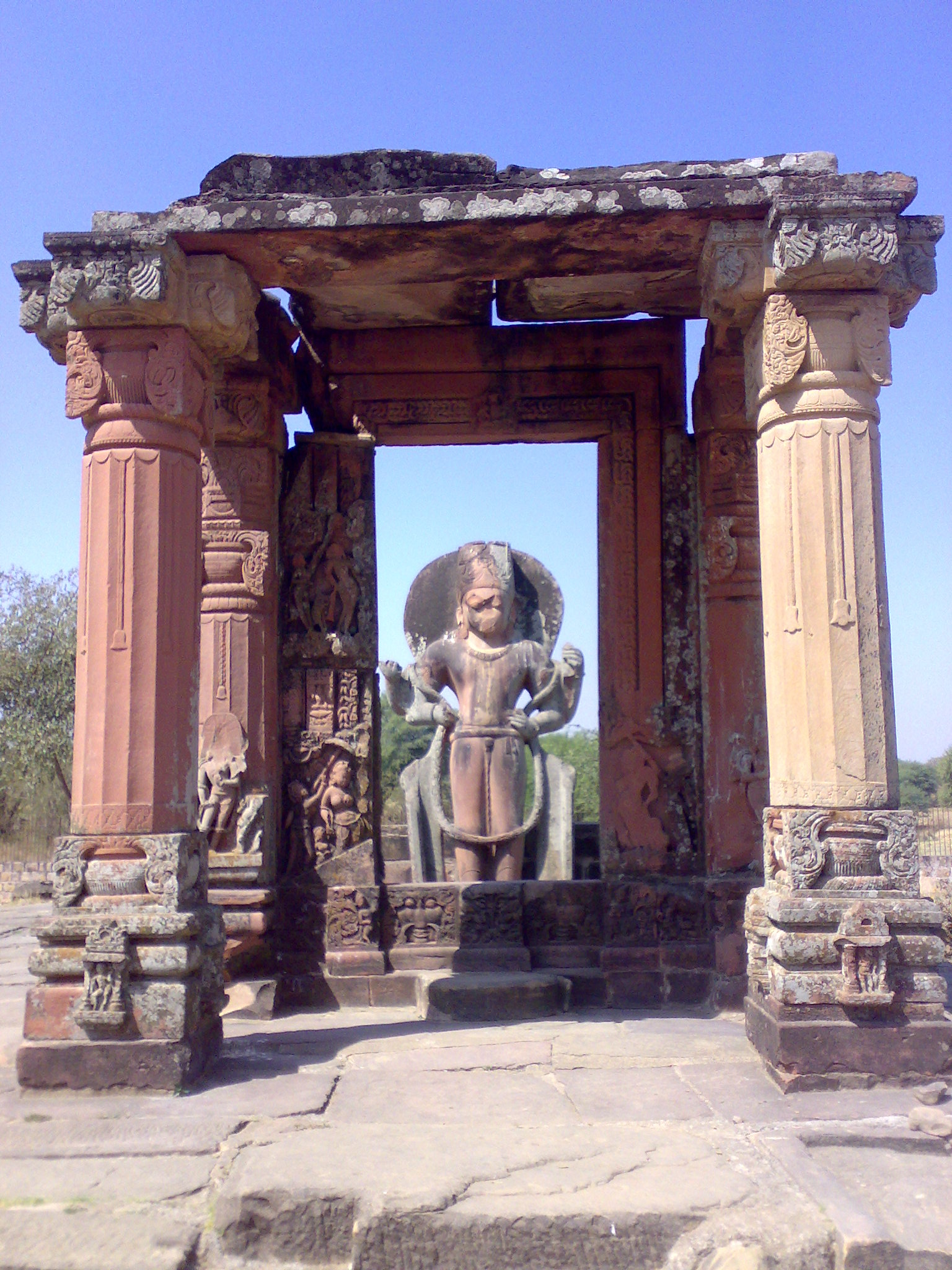
- Mandapa of the Vishnu Temple at Eran
- Successor: Dhanyaviṣṇu
- Died: 498 CE, Eran
- Burial: Eran, Madhya Pradesh
- Religion: Vaishnavism
- Military career
- Conflicts: First Battle of Eran

Mātṛviṣṇu was a Brahmin and a feudatory of the Gupta Empire. He is mentioned in several inscriptions of Eran, Central India, who fought along with the emperor Bhanugupta in the First Battle of Eran in which he was martyred. In 484 CE, he is described as being a maharaja and the Vishayapati (district officer) of Eran under the reign of Maharaja Surasmichandra, who governed the region between the Yamuna and the Narmada River. He comes from a family of pious Brahmins; his grandfather was Indraviṣṇu and his forefather was Varuṇaviṣṇu, both known for their participation in studies of scripture and enactment of sacrificial rites.

== Etymology ==
Mātṛviṣṇu is mentioned in the Eran Stone Boar Inscription from the reign of Toramana (500–515 CE), and in the Eran Stone Pillar Inscription of Budhagupta. Mātṛ may signify one of the seven Mātṛkās or possibly, Vedic Mātariśvan (read Agni) and its concatenation with Viṣṇu underlines a unique theological or cultural synthesis pertinent of the Gupta period.

== Religious activities ==
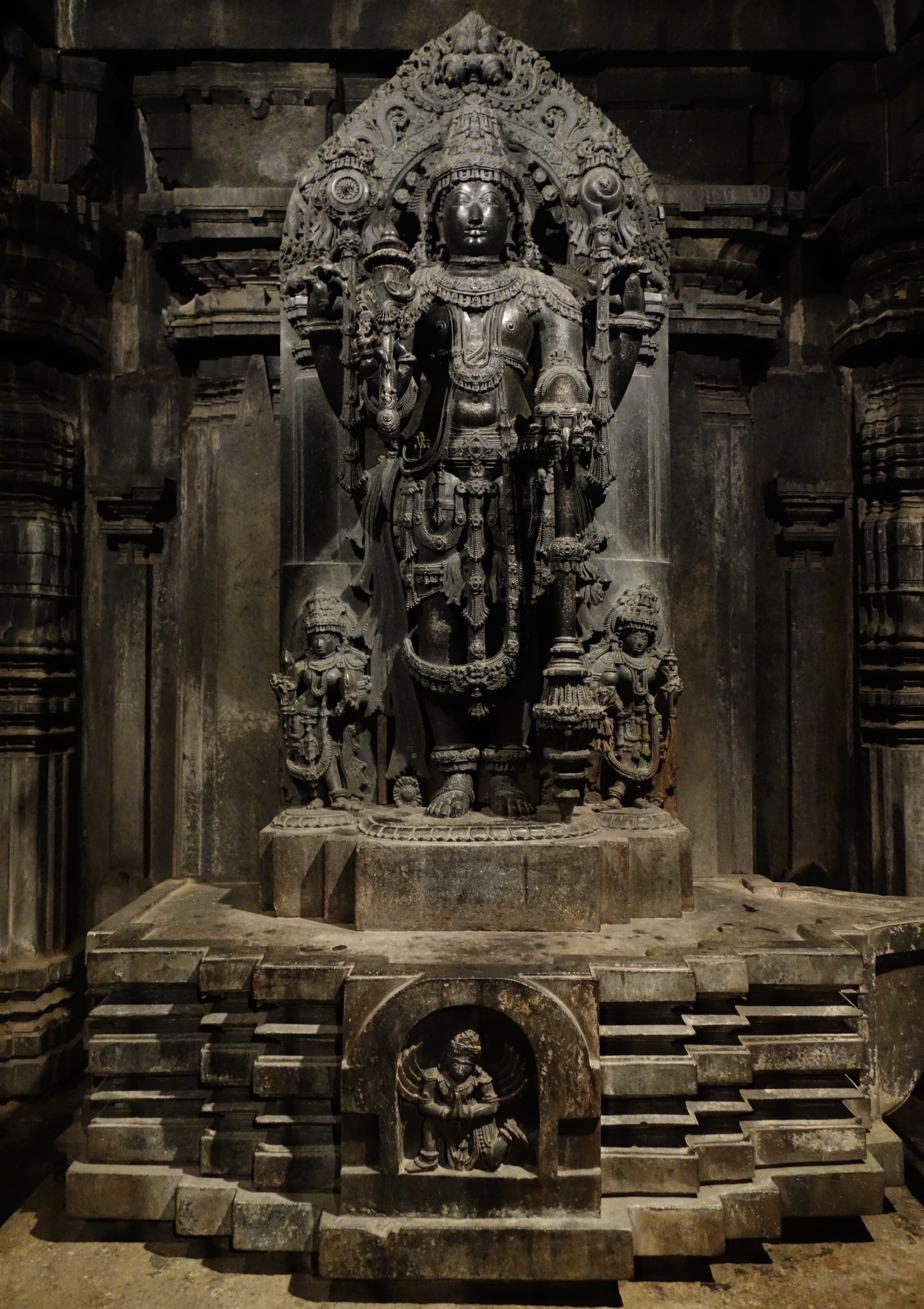
Sculpture of Janardana, Somanathapura

The stone pillar in Eran was installed by Mātṛviṣṇu and is called the Column of Janārdana (Viṣṇu/Kṛṣṇa) - a thin, 13-metre-high column. He established, with his younger brother Dhanyaviṣṇu, a twin temple complex dedicated to Viṣṇu on the southern banks of the Bina River. Janārdana's emblem (Garuda) stands out on the pillar. This complex grew during Budhagupta's reign, reflecting the imperial standard and the pride of Gupta Empire.{

== Military achievements ==
=== Testimonials ===
Mātṛviṣṇu is described in the Eran Stone Pillar Inscription of Budhagupta as a mighty and triumphal king, whose renown spread "to the frontiers of the four oceans". He also claimed to have been chosen by the “goddess of sovereignty” as her consort — language that echoed the epithets used for Gupta emperors such as Samudragupta and Skandagupta. His self-titled Maharaja, while demonstrating his subordination to it within the Gupta administrative system, shows that he asserted some measure of authority.

=== First Battle of Eran ===
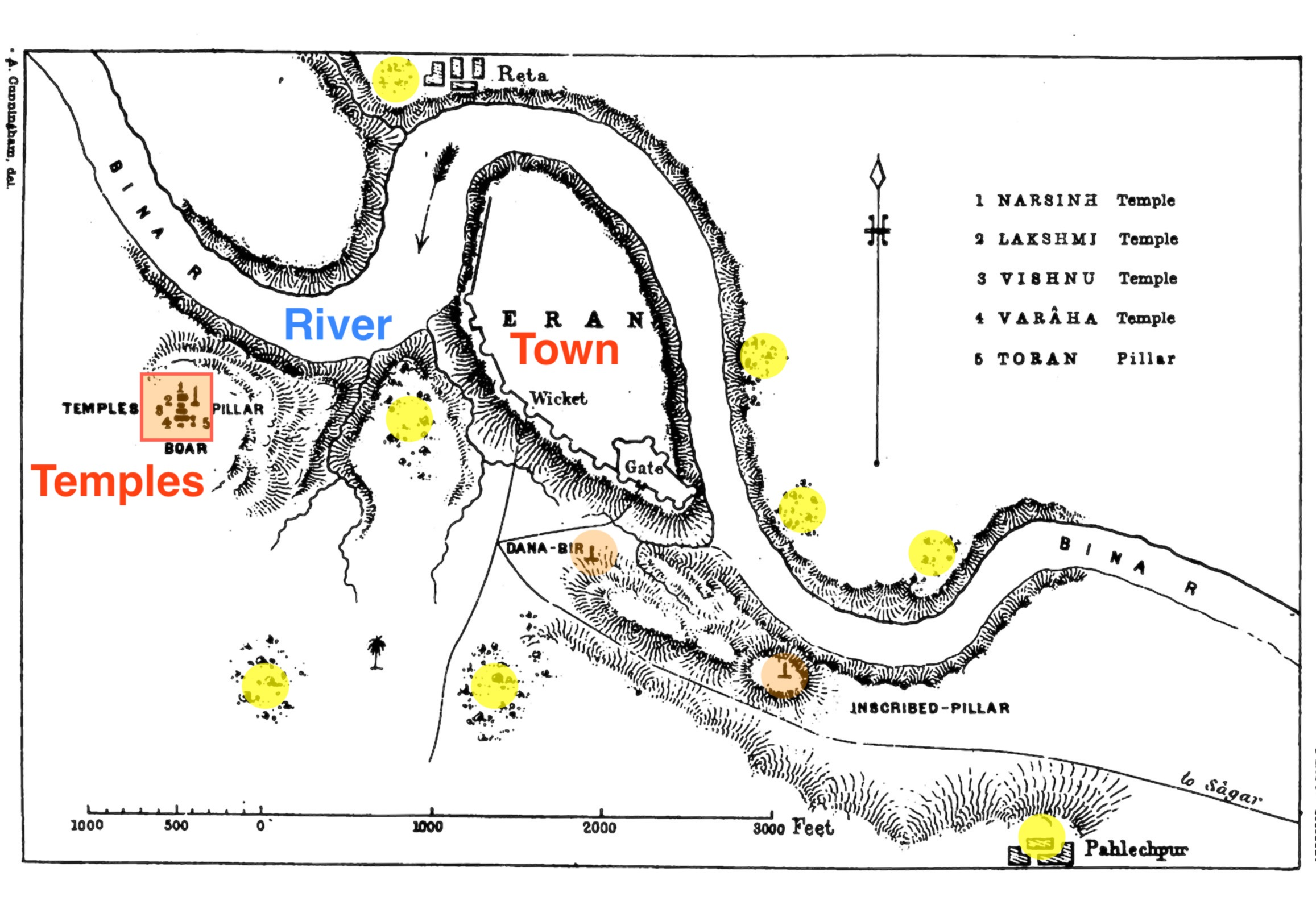
Eran archaeological site map, 1880 sketch

Mātṛviṣṇu perished during the First Battle of Eran (Betwa Valley). His brother Dhanyaviṣṇu commissioned a Varāhamūrti (boar idol) at Eran and supervised the building of a temple in memory of his brother. The acts are etched to stone 'deeds' from the first year of the reign of Toramana, signifying a shift of allegiance to the marauding Huna forces.{

The inscriptions reveal that in these regions, the Gupta administration was fragmented, and the feudal system (mamsa) prevalent then enabled local chiefs to change their loyalty when it suited them. The defection of Dhanyaviṣṇu to the Hunas after the death of Mātṛviṣṇu demonstrates how local feudatories supported the conquest of the Gupta Empire by Toramana. This transition took place not long after 484 CE, probably within a generation.

== Legacy ==
Mātṛviṣṇu's contributions to religious architecture, monuments, sculptures, and his royal pretensions are facets of the networks of loyalty and power that characterized politics in distinctly Gupta-era India. The surviving inscriptions of Mātṛviṣṇu and his family aid in reconstructing the cultural, religious, and administrative world of an emperor.

== See also ==
- Bhanugupta
- Second Battle of Eran
- Dhanyaviṣṇu
