= Aulikara−Hunnic War =

515 CE military conflict between Alchon Huns and Aulikaras

Aulikara-Hunnic War of 515
- Part of the Gupta-Hunnic Wars and the First Hunnic War
Date	515 CE
Location	Malwa
Result	Aulikara victory
Territorial changes	Alchon Huns retreated to Punjab

Belligerents
Aulikaras	Alchon Huns

Commanders and leaders
Prakashadharman	Toramana

The Aulikara−Hunnic war (also known as the Battle of Rishtal) was a military conflict between Alchon Huns headed by Toramana and Aulikaras led by Prakashadharman.

== Background ==
Tormana had adopted the title of "Great King of Kings" (Mahārājadhirāja ), in his Eran boar inscription. He carried out extensive conquests in India up to Eran.

== The battle ==
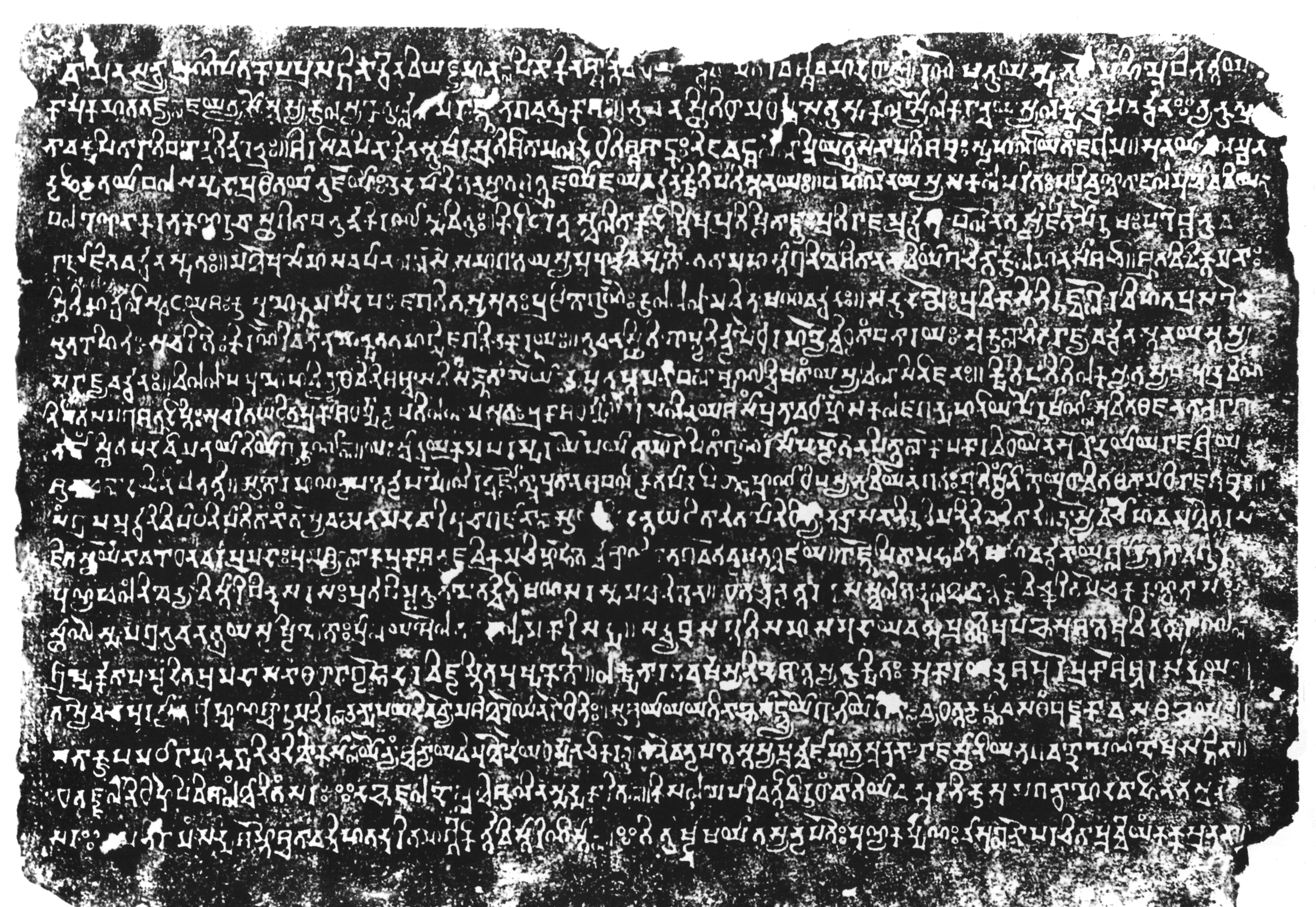

In accordance with the Rishtal inscription Prakashadharma of Dasapura claims victory over the Hun King Toramana for which his viceroy naigama Bhagavaddosa erected the Prakasesvara Temple in sign of their victory. Prakashadharma marched with a few troops for an assault, they ambushed the Huns at Rishtal, large number of war elephants were killed by the artillery attack of the Aulikaras. The attack created a confusion in the ranks of the Hunnic army by seeking advantage, the Aulikaras charged at the Huns and Toramana ordered a retreat. The Hunnic army was routed to Airkina, Prakashadharma made an offensive at Airkina which would demolish the Hunnic Army and their infantry to retreat from tactical positions, Aulikaras took a number of Hun soldiers and civilians as prisoners. According to the Risthal inscription, Prakashadharma sacked Toramana's camp and carried off women from his harem. This conflict ended the First Hunnic war.

== Aftermath ==
The conflict ended the First Hunnic War with the defeat of Toramana, he died in Varanasi while his westward retreat caused by his conflicts with Narasimhagupta. The Huns retreated to Punjab.
