= Sanjeli inscriptions =

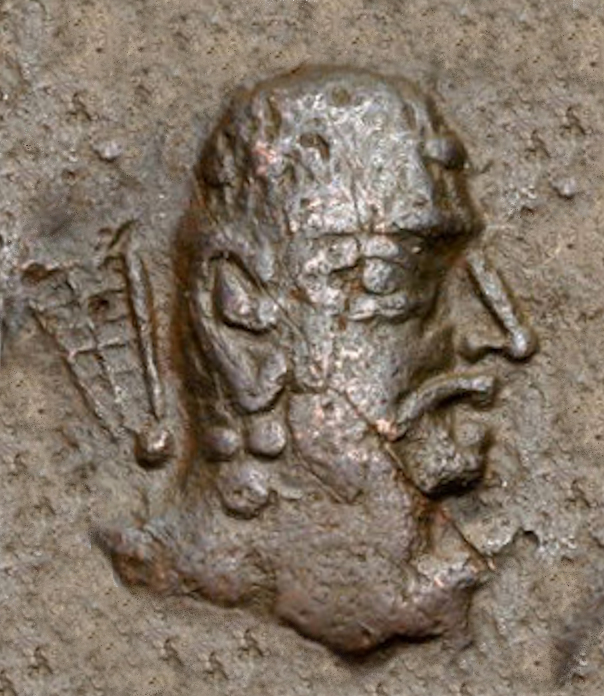
According to the Sanjeli inscriptions, Alchon Huns ruler Toramana ruled in the area of Gujarat.

Find spot of the Sanjeli inscriptions.

The Sanjeli inscriptions consist in three copperplate charters found in Sanjeli in northern Gujarat, dated to 499 CE, 502 CE and 515 CE respectively: they are the "Sanjeli Charter of the Merchants", "Sanjeli Charter of Bhūta" and the "Sanjeli Charter of Mātṛdāsa". The copperplates mention the rule of Alchon Huns king Toramana in the area, as mahārājādhirājaśrī toramāṇe ("Great King of Kings Toramana", in the Sanjeli Charter of the Merchants).

The first copperplate refers to the 3rd year of the reign of Toramana, and describes pious gifts made by merchants in the area of Vadrapali in the district of Sivabhagapura.

The copperplates also describes how the local king Maharaja Bhuta in Sanjeli was made Governor (visayapati) of the district of Sivabhagapura (northern Gujarat) by the grace of Toramana.

The Sanjeli inscriptions indicate that Toramana penetrated at least as far as northern Gujarat, and possibly to the trading port of Bharukaccha.
