= Toramana =

King of the Alchon Huns from 493 to 515

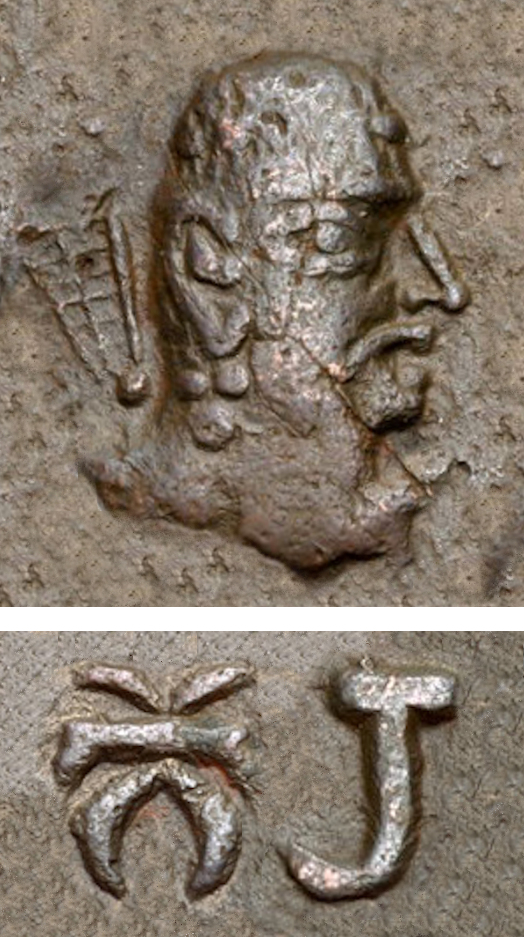
- Portrait of Toramana and Gupta script initials 𑀢𑁄𑀭 Tora, from his bronze coinage. Find spots of epigraphic inscriptions indicating local control by Toramana.

King of the Alchon Huns
- Reign: 493–515
- Predecessor: Mehama
- Successor: Mihirakula
- Religion: Vaishnavism

Toramana, also called Toramana Shahi Jauvla, (Gupta script: 𑀢𑁄𑀭𑀫𑀸𑀡 To-ra-mā-ṇa, ruled circa 493–515) was the king of the Alchon Huns from 493 until his death in 515. Toramana consolidated the Alchon power in Punjab (present-day Pakistan and northwestern India), and conquered northern and central India including Eran in Madhya Pradesh. Toramana used the title "Great King of Kings" (Mahārājadhirāja 𑀫𑀳𑀸𑀭𑀸𑀚𑀥𑀺𑀭𑀸𑀚), equivalent to "Emperor", in his inscriptions, such as the Eran boar inscription.

The Sanjeli inscription of Toramana speaks of his conquest and control over Malwa and Gujarat. His territory also included Uttar Pradesh, Rajasthan and Kashmir. He probably went as far as Kausambi, where one of his seals was discovered.

According to the Rīsthal inscription, discovered in 1983, the Aulikara king Prakashdharman of Malwa defeated him. Toramana’s inscriptions show his transition from an independent ruler to a vassal after his defeat in 515 CE. Initially titled "Mahārājadhirāj," he later served under Prakashdharman and Yasodharman. This shift reflects the declining power of the Hunas in early medieval India.

== Overview ==
Toramana is known from Rajatarangini, through coins and inscriptions.

=== Punjab inscription ===
An inscription found at Kura in the Salt Range in Pakistan records the building of a Buddhist monastery by a person named Rotta Siddhavriddhi during the reign of the Huna ruler Toramana. The donor expresses the wish that the religious merit gained by his gift be shared by him with the king and his family members. In the Khurā inscription (495-500, from the Salt Range in Punjab and now in Lahore), Toramana assumes the Indian regnal titles in addition to central Asian ones: Rājādhirāja Mahārāja Toramāṇa Shahi Jauvla. Among which Shahi is considered to be his Title and Jauvla being an epithet or Biruda. This is a Buddhist record in hybrid Sanskrit, recording the gift of a monastery (vihāra) to members of the Mahīśāsaka school.

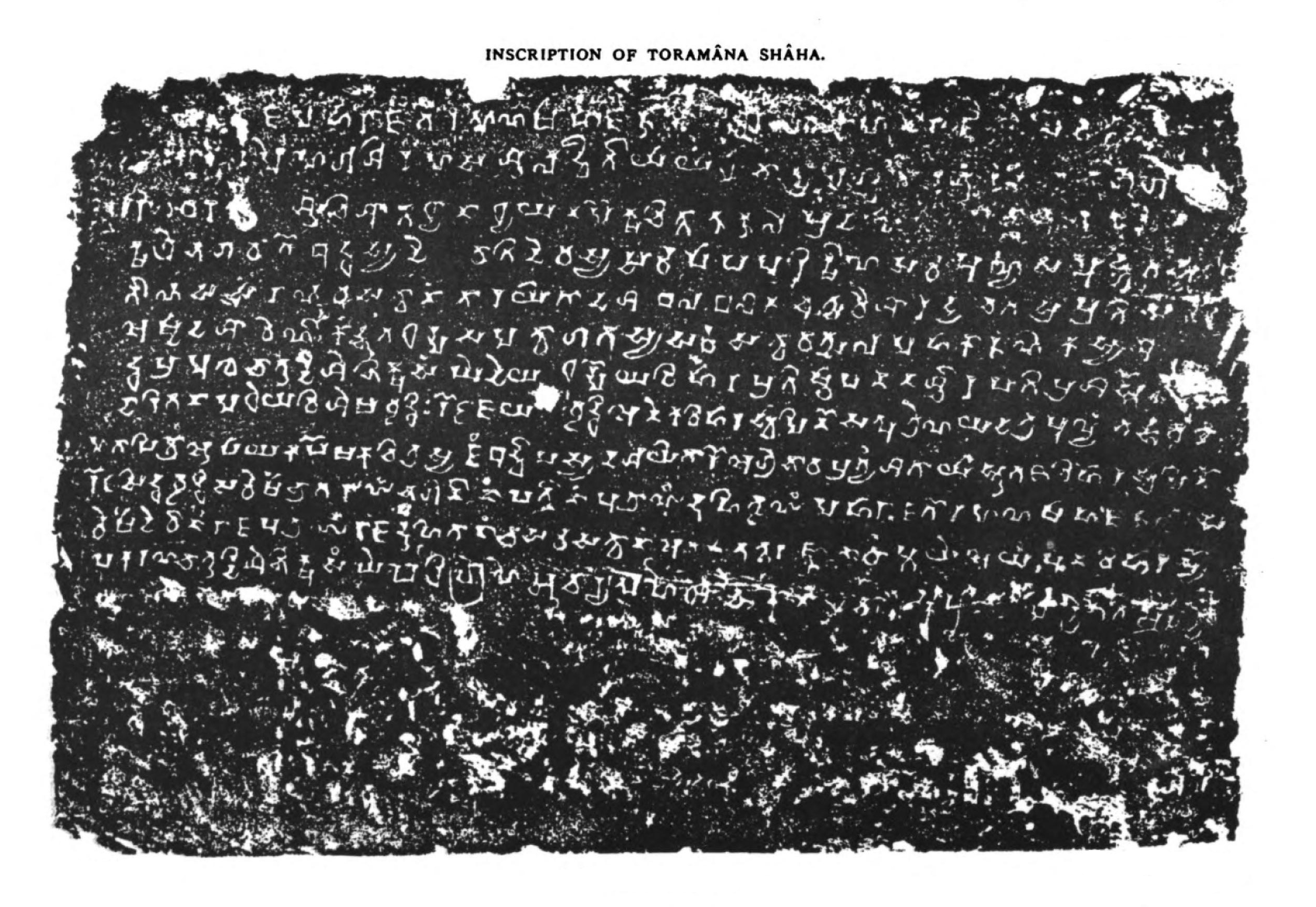
The Kura inscription of Toramana. Starting "In the prosperous reign of the King of Kings, the Great King Toramana Shahi Jauhkha...". "Toramana" ( Gupta script: Toramāṇa, appears in the 1st line of the inscription

=== Gwalior inscription of Mihirakula ===
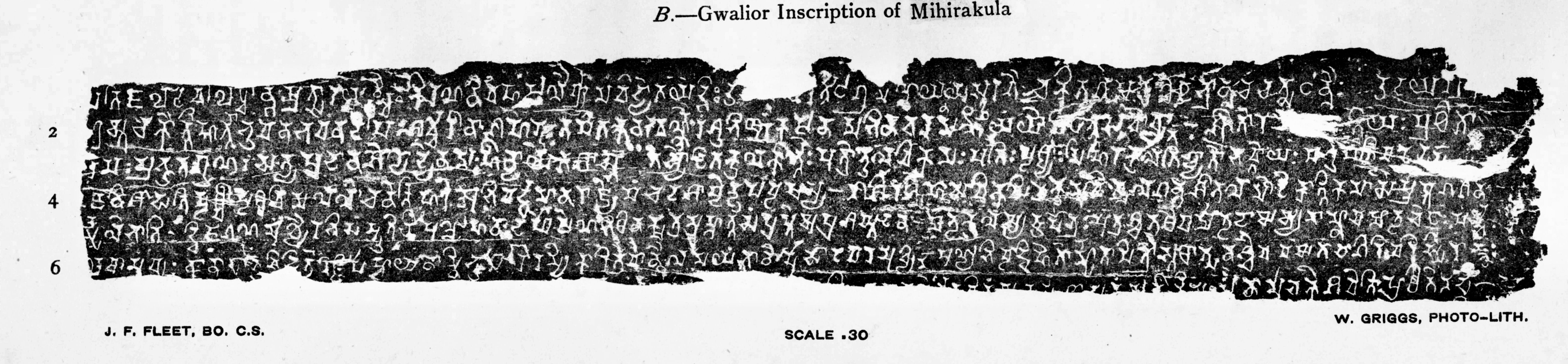
Gwalior inscription of Mihirakula in which Toramana is eulogized.

In the Gwalior inscription of Mihirakula, from Gwalior in northern Madhya Pradesh, India, and written in Sanskrit, Toramana is described as:

"A ruler of [the earth], of great merit, who was renowned by the name of the glorious Tôramâna; by whom, through (his) heroism that was specially characterized by truthfulness, the earth was governed with justice."

=== Eran Boar inscription ===
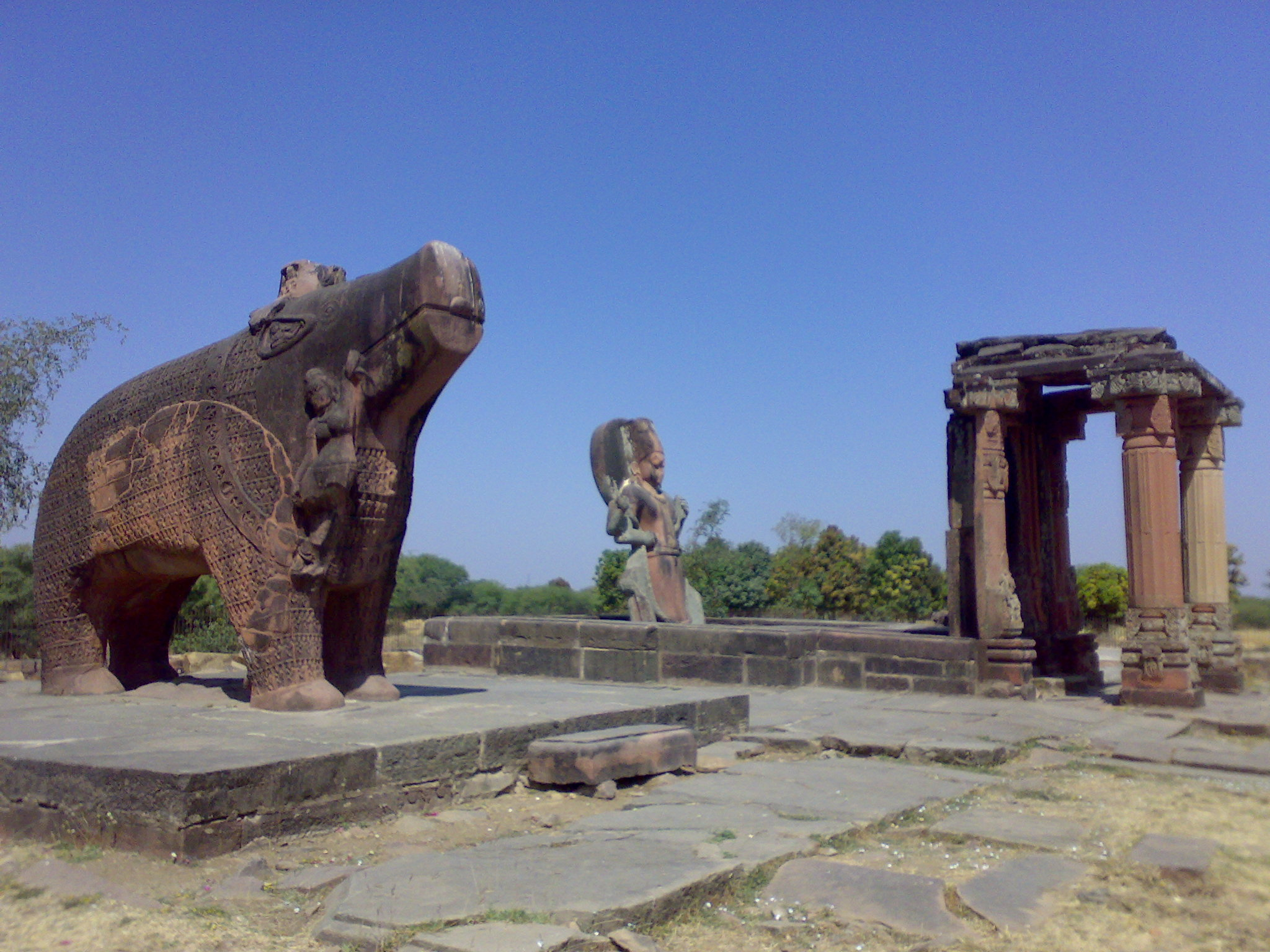
The Eran boar (left) on which an inscription relating to Toramana can be found.

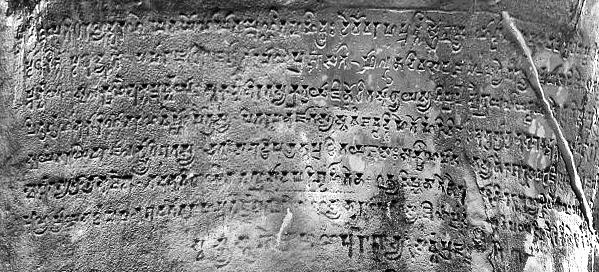
The Eran boar inscription.

The Eran Boar inscription (in Eran, Malwa, 540 km south of New Delhi, state of Madhya Pradesh) of his first regnal year indicates that eastern Malwa was included in his dominion. The Eran Boar inscription was erected in honor of the deity Vishnu as his avatar, Varaha.

Om ! Victorious is the god (Vishnu), who has the form of a Boar; who, in the act of lifting up the earth {out of the waters}, caused the mountains to tremble with the blows of {his} hard snout; (and) who is the pillar (for the support) of the great house which is the three worlds !

— Eran Boar Inscription

The statue is of the deity in form of a boar, with engravings display it protecting rishis and upholding Dharma. Additionally, the statue contains Sanskrit inscriptions inscribed on the neck of the boar, in 8 lines of in Brahmi script. It also records the building of the temple in which the current Varaha image stands, by Dhanyaviṣṇu, the younger brother of the deceased Maharaja Mātṛviṣṇu. The first line of the inscription, made after 484/85 CE mentions the "Maharajadhiraja Toramana" ("The great king of king Toramana") and reads:

"In year one of the reign of the King of Kings Sri-Toramana, who rules the world with splendor and radiance...."

— Eran Boar inscription.

=== Sack of Kausambi ===
The presence of seals in the name of "Toramana" and "Hunaraja" in Kausambi, suggests that the city was probably sacked by the Alkhons under Toramana in 497–500.

=== Defeats ===
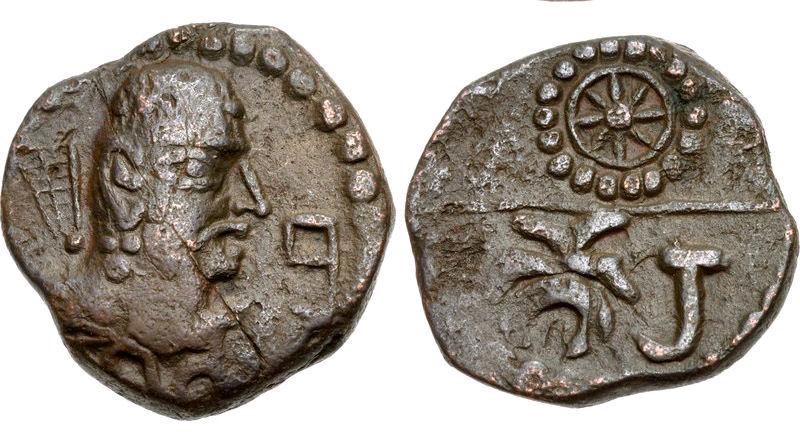
Coin of Toramana. The initials "Tora" in Brahmi script appear in large letters on the reverse, under the solar wheel design.

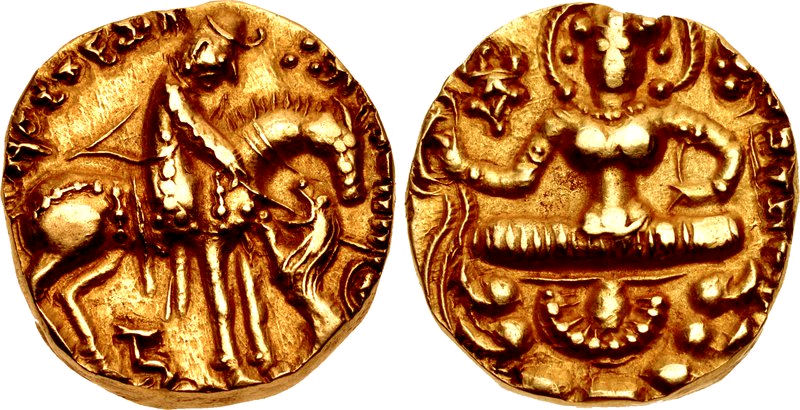
A rare gold coin of Toramana with Lakshmi on the reverse (c. 490–515), inspired from contemporary Gupta coins, such as those of Narasimhagupta Baladitya. The obverse legend reads "avanipati torama(no) vijitya vasudham divam jayati": "The lord of the earth, Toramana, having conquered the earth, wins Heaven".

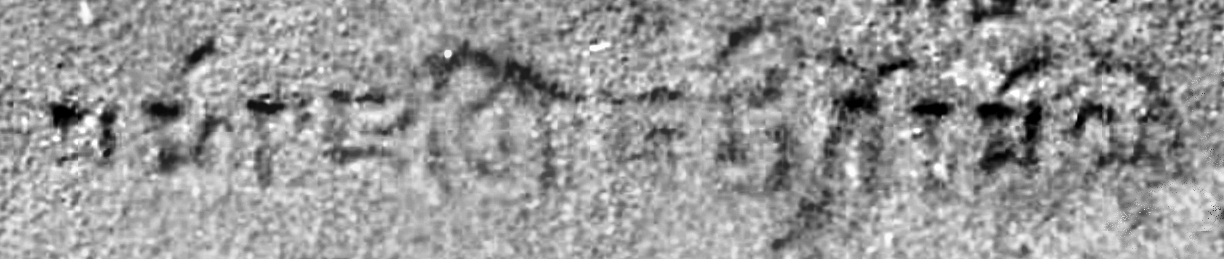
Inscription 𑀫𑀳𑀸𑀭𑀸𑀚𑀥𑀺𑀭𑀸𑀚 𑀰𑁆𑀭𑀻 𑀢𑁄𑀭𑀫𑀸𑀡 Mahārājadhirāja Shrī Toramāṇa ("Great King of Kings, Lord Toramana"), in the Gupta script, in the Eran boar inscription.

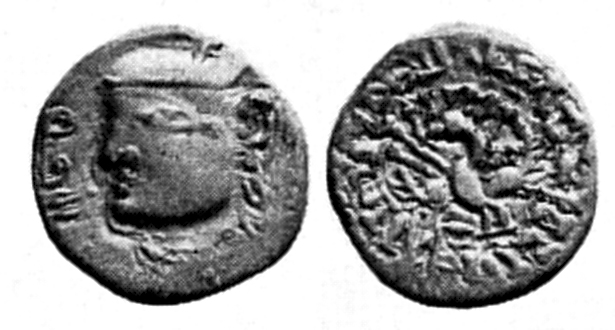
Silver coin of Toramana in Western Gupta Empire style, with the Gupta peacock and Brahmi legend on the reverse: vijitavaniravanipati sri toramana divam jayati. Similar to the silver coin type of Skandagupta for example, although Toramana faces to left whether Gupta rulers faced to the right, a possible symbol of antagonism. On the obverse the date "52" is also inscribed. A modern image: .

According to the Rishtal stone-slab inscription, discovered in 1983, the Aulikara king Prakashadharma of Malwa defeated him in 515 CE. Historian Thaplyal suggests that this seal confirms Toramana's status as a vassal king following his defeat by Prakashdharman around 515 CE. Toramana likely continued in this role under Yasodharman, Prakāśadharman's successor. Evidence supporting Toramana’s independent rule prior to his defeat includes the Sanjeli copper plate inscription (dated 502–503 CE), which refers to him as "paramabhațțaraka mahārājadhirāja sioramane" ("The most holy and supreme one, the Great King of Kings Toramana"). Additionally, the Eran boar inscription, dated between 510 and 513 CE, also uses the title "Mahārājadhirāj." These titles, however, predate his loss to Prakāśadharman, as documented in the Risthal inscription from 515 CE.

Toramana may also have been defeated by the Indian Emperor Bhanugupta of the Gupta Empire in 510 A.D. according to the Eran inscription, although the "great battle" to which Bhanagupta participated is not explicited.

A few silver coins of Toramana closely followed the Gupta silver coins. The only difference in the obverse is that the king's head is turned to the left. The reverse retains the fantailed peacock and the legend is almost similar, except the change of name to Toramana Deva.

A Jaina work of the 8th century, the Kuvalayamala states that he lived in Pavvaiya on the bank of the Chandrabhaga and enjoyed the sovereignty of the world.

== Successor ==
Toramana was succeeded by his son Mihirakula.

== See also ==
- First Battle of Eran
- Hephthalite Empire
- Mihirakula
- Alchon Huns

== Notes ==
| Preceded by Khingila I | King of the Alchon Huns | Succeeded by Mihirakula |
