= Eran boar inscription of Toramana =

510 Sanskrit inscription in India

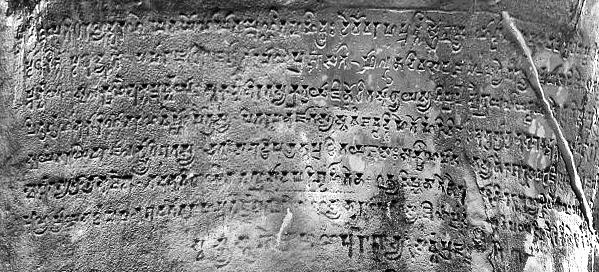
- Eran boar inscription of Alchon Huns ruler Toramana
- Material: Red sandstone statue
- Writing: Sanskrit
- Created: 14 June 510
- Period/culture: Gupta era
- Discovered: Eran
- Place: Eran
- Present location: Eran

Location
- Location of the Eran boar inscription of Toramana

The Eran boar inscription of Toramana, is a stone inscription found in Eran in the Malwa region of Madhya Pradesh, India. It is 8 lines of Sanskrit, the first three of which are in meter and the rest in prose, written in a North Indian script. It is carved on the neck of a freestanding 11 feet (3.4 m) high red sandstone Varaha statue, a zoomorphic iconography of Vishnu avatar, and dated to the 6th century. The inscription names king Toramana, ruler of the Alchon Huns, as ruling over Malwa ("governing the earth") and records that a Dhanyaviṣṇu is dedicating a stone temple to Narayana (Vishnu).

== Date ==
The inscription does not give any date, but mentions Toramana is "governing the earth", which is interpreted to mean the Malwa region site where this inscription is found. According to Radhakumud Mookerji, this means that the inscription was made after 510 CE when the Gupta king Bhanugupta and his local chief Goparaja had lost Malwa region after Toramana's invasion. It must be before 513 CE, because Toramana died in Varanasi while on his campaign to conquer eastern India.

The inscription was made by a Vishnu devotee named Dhanyaviṣṇu, the younger brother of the deceased Maharaja Mātṛviṣṇu, who is the same person who also erected a pillar in Eran. John Fleet calls it an inscription belonging to 6th-century Vaishnavism, a tradition of Hinduism.

== Description ==
The inscription is written under the neck of the boar, in 8 lines of Sanskrit in the Brahmi script. The boar represents the God Varaha, an avatar of Vishnu. The inscription was found in 1838 by T.S. Burt, who brought it to the attention of James Prinsep. It was published in 1838 by Prinsep with a translation. In 1861, FitzEdward Hall disagreed with Prinsep's report and published a revised edition of the inscription and a new translation. Fleet published his own translation and interpretation of the inscription in 1888. The translations for the inscription vary significantly, though the central theme is similar.

The region around the inscription, the boar sculpture's wall is covered with reliefs, predominantly of rishis (sages) and saints of Hinduism. This iconography aligns with Hindi texts in which the boar avatar symbolically protects saints and scholars. Earth goddess Bhudevi (Prithivi) is depicted as a female figure cliniging to the boar's right tusk. A small shrine rests on the boar's shoulder. Both the sculpture and the surrounding site are damaged, with cracks traversing the boar, including one that passes directly through the inscription

=== John Fleet's Translation ===
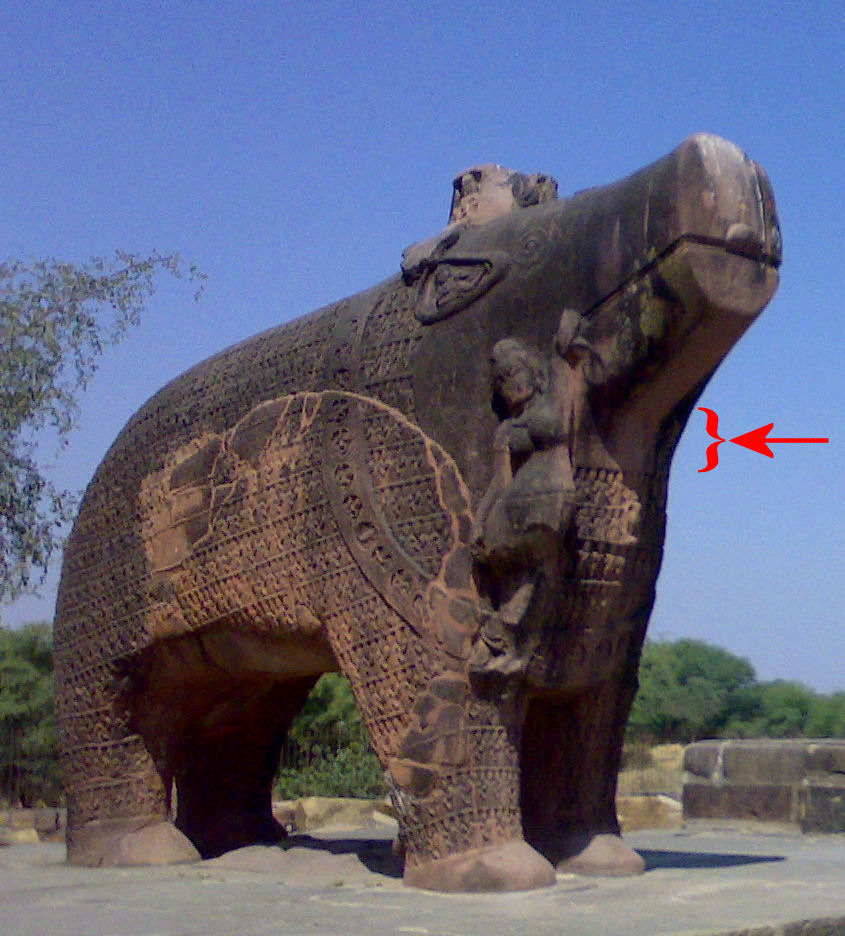
The Eran boar, under the neck of which the Toramana inscription can be found (area indicated in red).

The John Fleet translation of the inscription reads:

Om ! Victorious is the god (Vishnu), who has the form of a Boar; who, in the act of lifting up the earth {out of the waters}, caused the mountains to tremble with the blows of {his} hard snout; (and) who is the pillar (for the support) of the great house which is the three worlds !

(Line 1 .)— In the first year; while the Maharajadhiraja, the glorious Toramana of great fame {and} of great luster, is governing the earth.

(L. 2 .)— On the tenth day of (the month) Phalguna, — on this {lunar day}, {specified} as above by the regnal year and month and day, {and} invested as above with its own characteristics.

(L. 3 .)— By Dhanyaviṣṇu,— the younger brother, obedient to him {and} accepted with favour by him, of the Maharaja Mātṛviṣṇu, who has gone to heaven; who was excessively devoted to the Divine One; who, by the will of (the god) Vidhatri, was approached {in marriage-choice} by the goddess of sovereignty, as if by a maiden choosing (him) of her own accord {to be her husband}; whose fame extended up to the border of the four oceans; who was possessed of unimpaired honour and wealth; {and} who was victorious in battle against many enemies; who was the son of the son’s son of Indravishnu; who was attentive to his duties; who celebrated sacrifices; who practiced private study {of the scriptures}; who was a Brahman saint; (and) who was the most excellent {of the followers} of the Maitreya clan {gotra} (Maitreya gotra came from the linage of sage Brighu) who was the son’s son of Varunavishnu, who imitated the virtuous qualities of {his} father;— and who was the son of Harivishnu, who' was the counterpart of {his} father in meritorious qualities, {and} was the cause of the advancement of his race

(L. 6.)— (By this Dhanyaviṣṇu) accomplishing, in unison with {the previously expressed wishes of} him, a joint deed of religious merit, for the sake of increasing the religious merit of (his) parents, this stone temple of the divine (god) Narayana, who has the form of a Boar {and} who is entirely devoted to {the welfare of} the universe, has been caused to be made in this his own vishaya of Airikina.

(L. 8.)— Let prosperity attend all the subjects, headed by the cows and the Brahmans!

— Eran boar inscription, Translator: Fleet.

=== Hall & Cunningham Translation ===
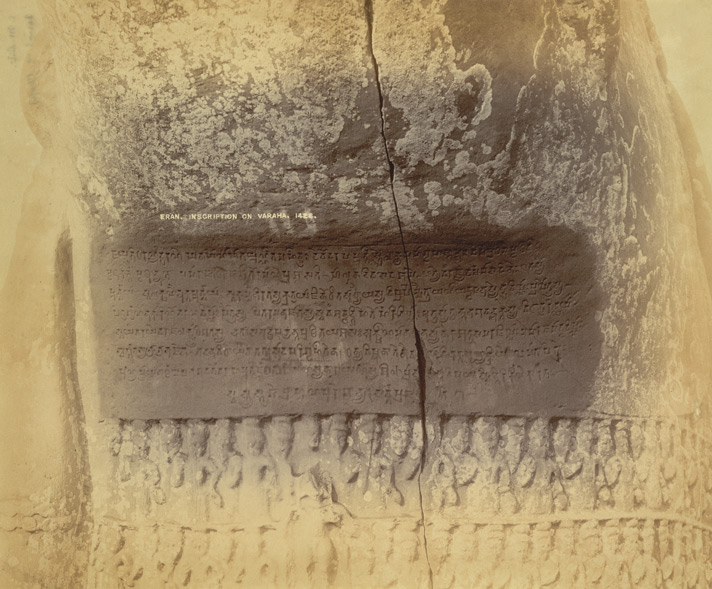
The inscription and nearby relief.

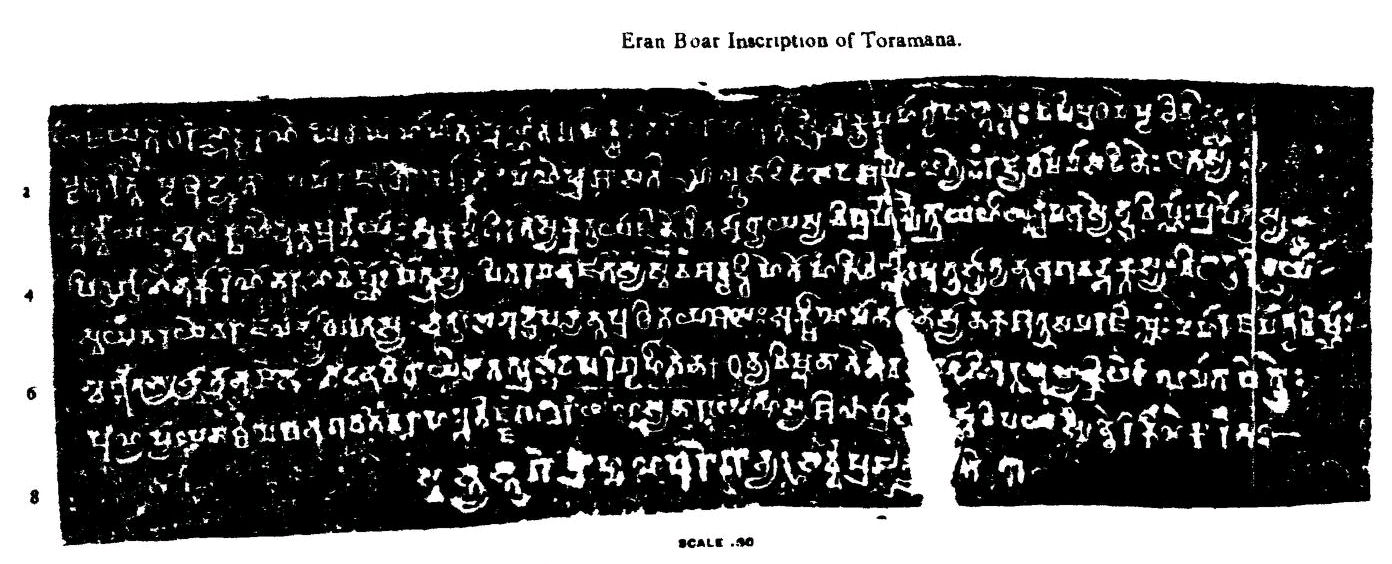
Imprint of the Eran boar inscription of Toramana.

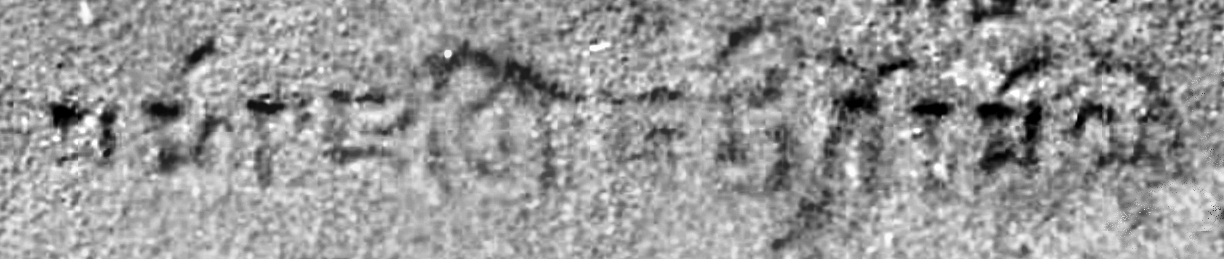
Inscription: Mahārājadhirāja Shrī Toramāṇa "Great King of Kings, Lord Toramana" in the Gupta script, in the Eran boar inscription.

Triumphant is the God who, in the likeness of a Boar, lifted up the earth;
who, by blows of his hard snout, tossed the mountains aloft;
the upholding pillar of that vast mansion, the threefold world.

In the first year that the auspicious Toramana, sovereign of great kings,
of extended fame and wide-spread effulgence, is governing the earth;
on the tenth day of Phalguna;
even so, in the year and month and on the day of his reign before mentioned,
during the first watch of the said lunar day
as circumstantiated of the great grandson of Indra Vishnu, —a Brahman saint,
of the illustrious Maitrayaniya monarchs,
who took delight in his duties, celebrated solemn sacrifices,
and well read in the scriptures;
grandson of Varuna Vishnu, who imitated the excellencies of his father;
son of Hari Vishnu, who was the counterpart of his sire,
and derived prosperity to his race, that is to say,
of the great king Mātṛviṣṇu, who was departed to elysium
a most devout worshipper of Bhagavat, who, by the will of the Ordainer,
acquired, like as a maiden sometimes elects her husband, the splendour of royalty;
of fame recognized as far as the four oceans; of unimperfect wealth;
victorious in many a battle over his enemies, —
the younger brother, Dhanyaviṣṇu, who did him due obeisance,
and was revered because of his favour;
whose righteous deeds have been notably unintermitted;—
with purpose to advance the merit of his mother and father,
in his dominions, in this town of Erakaina [Eran]
has caused this substantial temple of the adorable Narayana,
in form a boar, affectionately attached to the world, to be constructed.

May happiness attend the kine, the Brahmans, the magnates, and all the subjects.

— Eran boar inscription, Archaeological Survey Report, Translator: Hall

== See also ==
- Gwalior inscription of Mihirakula
