= Janardana =

Epithet of Vishnu

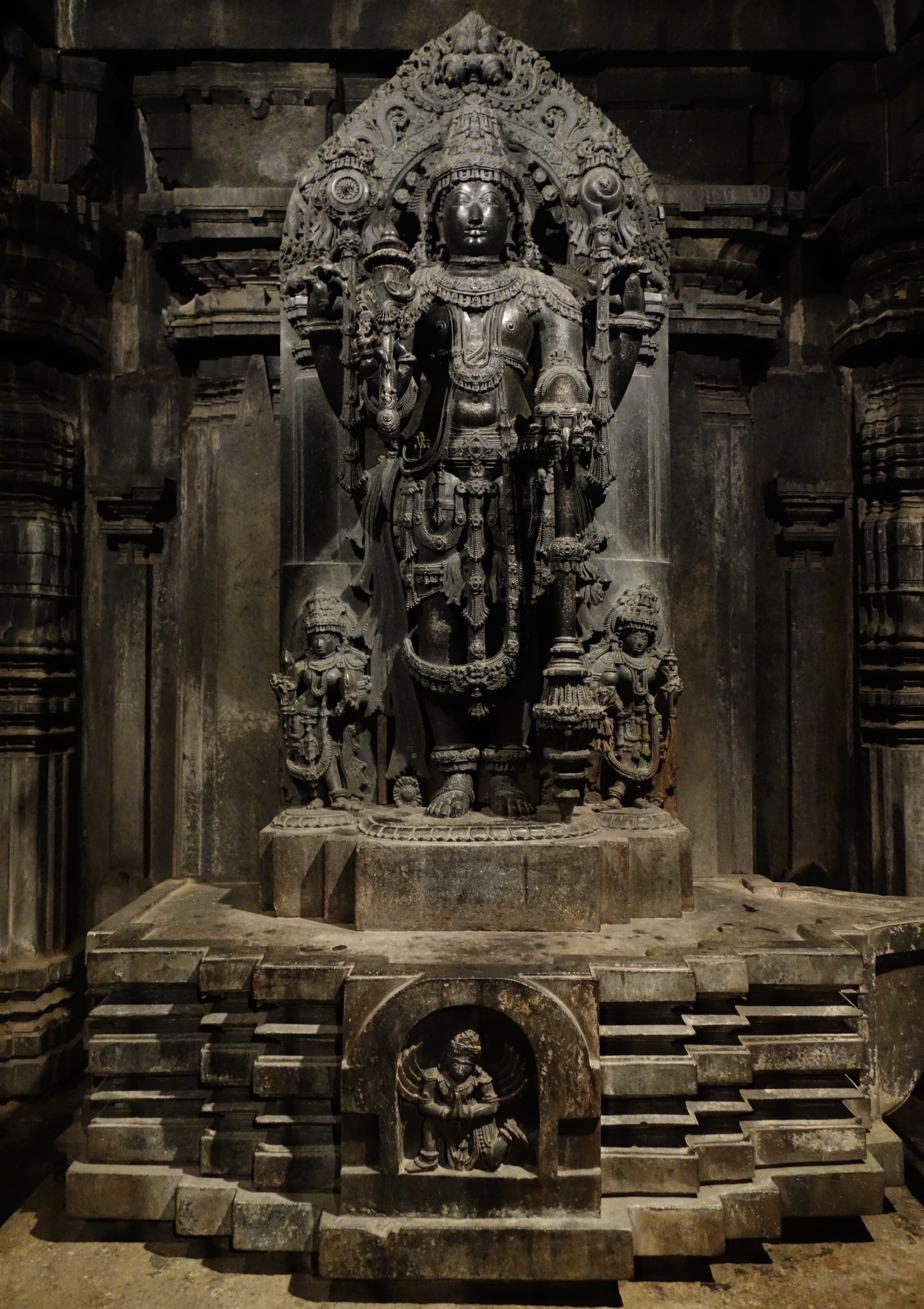
Sculpture of Janardana, Somanathapura

Janardana (Sanskrit: जनार्दन, romanized: Janārdana) is an epithet of Vishnu in the Puranas. Janardana means, “he who is the original abode and protector of all living beings”.Janardhana swamy temple in varkala, Thiruvananthapuram is one of the major shrine with Janardhana as the prime deity

== Literature ==
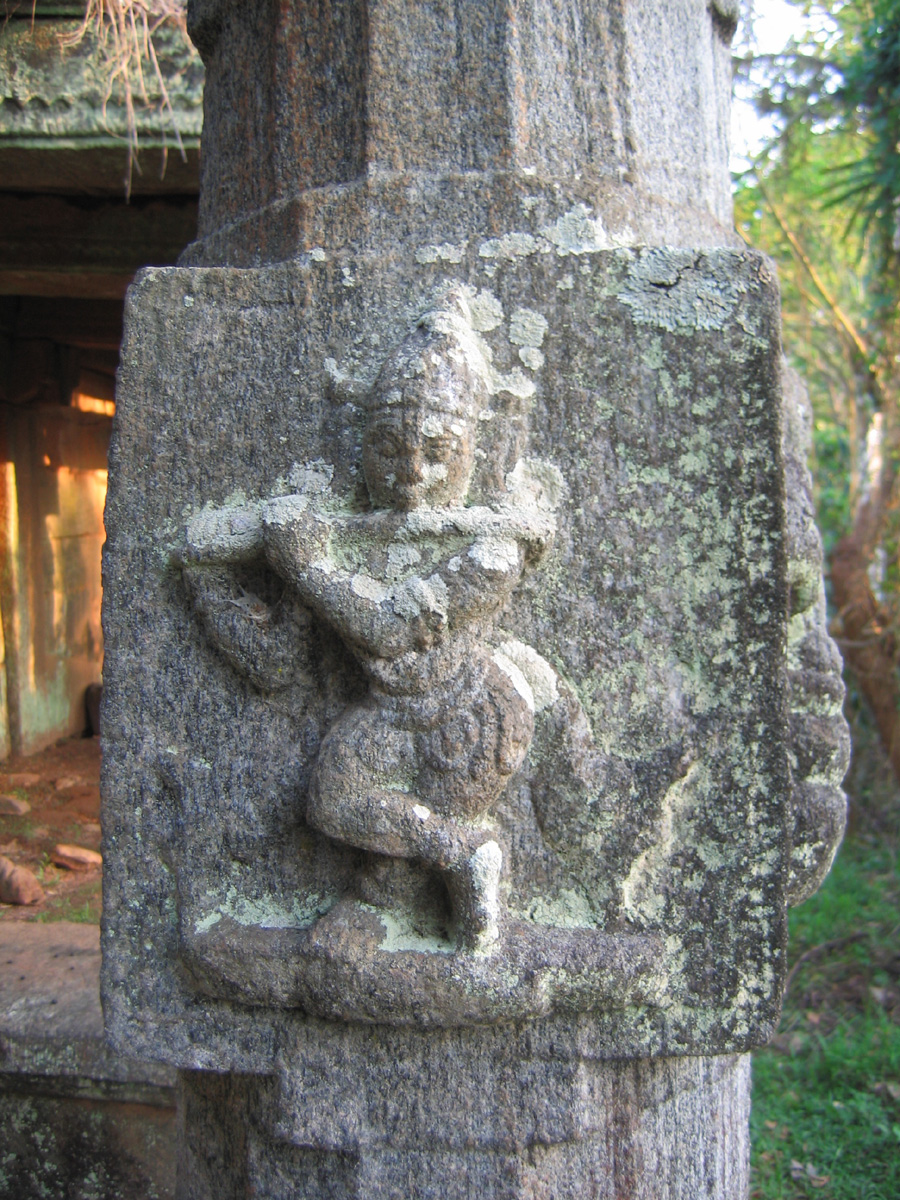
Krishna represented as Janardana in The Puthanathani Janardana temple

In the Mahabharata, Sanjaya uses this epithet of Vishnu to describe the latter's prowess to King Dhritarashtra:

You askest me repeatedly, O king, about the Pandavas for knowing their strength and weakness. Listen now to all that in brief. If the whole universe be placed on one scale and Janardana on the other, even then Janardana will outweigh the entire universe. Janardana, at his pleasure, can reduce the universe to ashes, but the entire universe is incapable of reducing Janardana to ashes. Wherever there is truthfulness, wherever virtue, wherever modesty, wherever simplicity, even there is Govinda. And thither where Krishna is, success must be. That soul of all creatures, most exalted of male beings, Janardana, guides, as if in sport, the entire earth, the firmament, and the heaven.

— Vyasa, Mahabharata, Section LXVIII

In the Bhagavad Gita, Arjuna invokes this epithet:

विस्तरेणात्मनो योगं विभूतिं च जनार्दन ।

भूयः कथय तृप्तिर् हि शृण्वतो नास्ति मेऽमृतम् ॥ १८ ॥

vistareṇātmano yogaṃ vibhūtiṃ ca janārdana | bhūyaḥ kathaya tṛptir hi śṛṇvato nāsti me'mṛtam || 18 ||

O Janārdana, please tell me again in detail about Your mystic powers and opulences, for I am not satiated from hearing Your nectarean words.

— Vyasa, Bhagavad Gita, Verse 10,18
