= Sanjeli =

Princely state in Gujarat state, India

Sanjeli State (maroon in upper area) within Rewa Kantha Agency, British India

Sanjeli (Hindi: संजेली) cotila, sometimes known as Sanjeda Mehvassi, is a Hindu former petty princely state, located in the present Gujarat in western India.

It is a tehsil of Dahod district.

== History ==
Sanjeli became a British protectorate in 1820. From 1820 to 1937, the territory remained stable at 88 square kilometers. In 1892, the state had a population of 3,751.

It became a third class state in Rewa Kantha Agency's Rewa Kantha division. In 1937 it merged with Baroda State into Baroda and Gujarat States Agency. The Maharaja enjoyed a privy purse of 40,000 rupees. In 1901 - 1914 it was under direct British India administration due to minority rule.

On 10 June 1948, it ceased to exist by accession to the Bombay State at India's independence.

== Ruling chiefs ==
Rulers held the title of Thakur.

- 1750 - 1789 (No. 38) Sardarsinhji
- 1789 - 1814 (No. 39) Bahadursinhji
- 1814 - 1857 (No. 40) Jagatsinhji
- 1858 - 1901 (No. 41) Pratapsinhji
- 1902 - 1941 (No. 42) Pushpsinhji
- 1941 - 1948 (No. 43) Narendrasinhji
